A university hospital is an institution which combines the services of a hospital with the education of medical students and with medical research. These hospitals are typically affiliated with a medical school or university. The following is a list of such hospitals.

Algeria
The Algerian Ministry of Health, Population and Hospital Reform maintains 15 public university teaching hospital centers (French: Centre Hospitalo-Universitaire or CHU) with 13,755 beds and one public university hospital (EHU) with 773 beds.
CHU Mustapha Pacha in Algiers Province, established in 1854
CHU Lamine Debaghine in Algiers Province
CHU Nafissa Hamoud in Algiers Province
CHU Issad Hassani in Algiers Province
CHU Ibn  Sina Anaba in Annaba Province
CHU Dorban in Annaba Province
CHU Hospital of Mother and Child El Bouni in Annaba Province
CHU Sainte Thérèse in Annaba Province
CHU Annaba Anti-Cancer Center in Annaba Province
CHU Béjaïa in Béjaïa Province
CHU Blida in Blida Province
CHU Hassid Ben Bouali in Blida Province
CHU Abdelhamid Ben Badis in Constantine Province
CHU Baloguat University in Laghouat Province
CHU Saadna Abdenour Sétif in Sétif Province
CHU Dr Hassani Abdelkader in Sidi Bel Abbès Province
CHU Tlemcen in Tlemcen Province

Argentina 
 Hospital de Clínicas "José de San Martín" of the University of Buenos Aires, Buenos Aires
 Hospital Universitario Austral of the Austral University, Buenos Aires
 Hospital Municipal De Moron "Ostaciana B. De Lavignolle", of the University of Buenos Aires
 Hospital Dr. Narciso Lopez De Lanus, of the University of Buenos Aires
 Hospital Laferrere, of the University of Buenos Aires
 Hospital Municipal Mendez, of the University of Buenos Aires
 Hospital MUÑIZ, of the University of Buenos Aires
 Hospital San Miguel, of the University of Buenos Aires
 Hospital Tornu, of the University of Buenos Aires
 Idim A Lanari, of the University of Buenos Aires
 Instituto De Oncologia Roffo, of the University of Buenos Aires
 Baldomero Sommer, of the University of Buenos Aires
 Hospital Municipal "Dr. Eduardo Wilde", of the University of Buenos Aires
 Hospital Ciudad de Boulogne, of the University of Buenos Aires
 Hospital Italiano de Buenos Aires, of the Instituto Universitario del Hospital Italiano

Australia

Australian Capital Territory 
 Canberra Hospital, Canberra - Australian National University Medical School
 National Capital Private Hospital, Garran - Australian National University Medical School
 Calvary Hospital, Canberra - Australian National University Medical School
 Calvary John James Hospital, Deakin - Australian National University Medical School
 Calvary Private Hospital, Bruce - Australian National University Medical School
 Canberra Eye Hospital, Symonston - Australian National University Medical School

New South Wales 
 Armidale Regional Hospital - Armidale - University of New South Wales Faculty of Medicine
 Batemans Bay Hospital, Batemans Bay - Australian National University Medical School
 Bega District Hospital, Bega - Australian National University Medical School
 Bega Valley Private Hospital, Bega - Australian National University Medical School
 Sapphire Coast Medical Practice at Bega and Tathra - Australian National University Medical School
 Blacktown Hospital, Blacktown - University of Sydney & Western Sydney University
 Camden and Campbelltown Hospitals (Campbelltown, Camden, Sydney) - Western Sydney University
 Cessnock District Hospital - Cessnock - University of New South Wales Faculty of Medicine
 Dubbo Base Hospital and Orange Base Hospital, Dubbo - Sydney Medical School
 Glen Innes District Hospital - Glen Innes- University of New South Wales Faculty of Medicine
 Gloucester Soldiers' Memorial Hospital- Gloucester - University of New South Wales Faculty of Medicine
 Gosford Hospital, Gosford - University of Newcastle, University of New England
 Goulburn Base Hospital, Goulburn - Australian National University Medical School
 Katungal Aboriginal Medical Service - Australian National University Medical School
 Kenmore Hospital, Goulburn - Australian National University Medical School
 St John of God Hospital, Goulburn - Australian National University Medical School
 Chisholm Ross Centre, Goulburn - Australian National University Medical School
 Gunnedah District Hospital - Gunnedah - University of New South Wales Faculty of Medicine
 Hornsby Ku-ring-gai Hospital, Hornsby - University of Sydney
 Inverell District Hospital- Inverell - University of New South Wales Faculty of Medicine
 Nepean Hospital, Kingswood(suburb of Sydney) - Sydney Medical School
 Liverpool Hospital, Liverpool - University of New South Wales & Western Sydney University
 Maitland Hospital- Maitland - University of New South Wales Faculty of Medicine
 Sapphire Clinic, Merimbula
 Moree District Hospital - Moree - University of New South Wales Faculty of Medicine
 Moruya Hospital, Moruya
 Muswellbrook District Hospital- Muswellbrook - University of New South Wales Faculty of Medicine
 Nelson Bay and District Polyclinic - Nelson Bay - University of New South Wales Faculty of Medicine
 Newcastle Mater Misericordiae Hospital - Newcastle - University of New South Wales Faculty of Medicine
 John Hunter Hospital - Newcastle - University of New South Wales Faculty of Medicine
 Orange Health Service, Orange - University of Sydney
 Pambula Hospital, Pambula
 Scott Memorial Hospital - Scone - University of New South Wales Faculty of Medicine
 Shoalhaven District Memorial Hospital, Nowra - University of Wollongong and University of New South Wales
 Singleton District Hospital - Singleton - University of New South Wales Faculty of Medicine
 Macquarie University Hospital, Sydney - Macquarie University Australian School of Advanced Medicine
 Prince of Wales Hospital (Sydney) - University of New South Wales
 Royal Prince Alfred Hospital, Sydney - Sydney Medical School 
 Westmead Hospital, Sydney - Sydney Medical School
 Royal Alexandra Hospital for Children, Sydney - Sydney Medical School
 Concord Repatriation General Hospital, Sydney - Sydney Medical School
 Royal North Shore Hospital, Sydney - Sydney Medical School
 Royal Hospital for Women, Sydney - University of Sydney, University of New South Wales
 Royal Prince Alfred Hospital, Sydney - University of Sydney
 St George Hospital (Sydney) - University of New South Wales
 St Vincent's Hospital, Sydney - University of New South Wales
 Sydney Adventist Hospital, Sydney - Sydney Medical School
 Sydney Children's Hospital, Sydney - University of New South Wales
 Sydney Dental Hospital, Sydney - University of Sydney
 Manning Base Hospital - Taree - University of New South Wales Faculty of Medicine
 Tamworth Base Hospital - Tamworth - University of New South Wales Faculty of Medicine
 Prince Albert Memorial Hospital - Tenterfield - University of New South Wales Faculty of Medicine
 Wollongong Hospital, Wollongong - University of Wollongong

Northern Territory 
 Royal Darwin Hospital, Tiwi - Flinders University, Charles Darwin University & University of Sydney

Queensland 
 Mater Health Services, Brisbane
 Princess Alexandra Hospital, Brisbane - University of Queensland
 Royal Brisbane & Women's Hospital - University of Queensland
 St Vincent's Hospital (Brisbane)
 The Prince Charles Hospital, Brisbane
 Wesley Hospital (Brisbane)
 Robina Hospital, Gold Coast - Bond University and Griffith University
 Greenslopes Private Hospital, Greenslopes
 Sunshine Coast University Hospital, Kawana Waters - University of the Sunshine Coast
 Gold Coast University Hospital, Southport - Bond University Faculty of Health Sciences and Medicine and Griffith University School of Medicine
 Townsville Hospital, Townsville - James Cook University

South Australia 
 Lyell McEwin Hospital, Adelaide - University of Adelaide & University of South Australia
 Royal Adelaide Hospital, Adelaide - University of Adelaide
 The Queen Elizabeth Hospital, Adelaide - University of Adelaide
 Women's and Children's Hospital, North Adelaide - University of Adelaide, University of South Australia and Flinders University
 Flinders Medical Centre, Bedford Park

Tasmania 
 Launceston General Hospital, Launceston - University of Tasmania Faculty of Health Sciences

Victoria 
 Royal Victorian Eye and Ear Hospital, East Melbourne - University of Melbourne & La Trobe University
 Frankston Hospital, Frankston - Monash University, Deakin University
 Austin Hospital, Melbourne - Monash University, Deakin University, Swinburne University of Technology, Victoria University of Technology and the Australian Catholic University
 Box Hill Hospital, Melbourne - Monash University, La Trobe University, Deakin University
 Mercy Hospital for Women, Melbourne - University of Melbourne
 Monash Children's Hospital, Melbourne
 Monash Medical Centre, Melbourne
 Royal Children's Hospital - University of Melbourne
 Royal Melbourne Hospital - University of Melbourne School of Medicine 
 Royal Women's Hospital, Melbourne - University of Melbourne and La Trobe University
 St Vincent's Hospital, Melbourne - The University of Melbourne
 The Alfred Hospital, Melbourne - Monash University
University Hospital Geelong, Geelong - Deakin University

Western Australia 
 Fiona Stanley Hospital, Murdoch
 Fremantle Hospital, Fremantle
 Sir Charles Gairdner Hospital, Nedlands
 Graylands Hospital, Perth
 Royal Perth Hospital, Perth 
 King Edward Memorial Hospital for Women, Subiaco
 Princess Margaret Hospital for Children, Subiaco

Austria 
Lower Austria
 Karl Landsteiner Private University of Health sciences Sankt Pölten - Karl Landsteiner Private University of Health sciences
Landesklinikum Krems, Krems an der Donau - Karl Landsteiner Private University of Health sciences
 Landesklinikum Tulln, Tulln an der Donau - Karl Landsteiner Private University of Health sciences

Salzburg
 Landesklinik St. Veit /Pongau – Lehrkrankenhaus der PMU, Sankt Veit im Pongau - Paracelsus Private Medical University of Salzburg
 Universitätskliniken Salzburg - Paracelsus Private Medical University of Salzburg
 Christian-Doppler-Klinik Salzburg - Paracelsus Private Medical University of Salzburg

Styria
LKH-Universitätsklinikum Graz - Medical University of Graz

Tyrol
 Universitätsklinik Innsbruck - Innsbruck Medical University

Upper Austria 
AKH Linz - Medical Faculty at Johannes Kepler University Linz
 Wagner-Jauregg-Nervenklinik, Linz - Medical Faculty at Johannes Kepler University Linz

Wien
Vienna General Hospital, Vienna - Medical University of Vienna
Krankenhaus der Barmherzigen Brüder Wien, Vienna - Medical University of Vienna

Belgium 
 University Hospital Antwerpen, in Antwerp
 Cliniques Universitaires Saint-Luc, university hospital of UCLouvain in Woluwe-Saint-Lambert, Brussels
 UZ Brussel, university hospital of the Vrije Universiteit Brussel in Jette, Brussels
 Hospitals and clinics associated with the Université libre de Bruxelles (ULB):
 Brugmann Hospital, Brussels
 Clinique César De Paepe, Brussels
 Erasmus Hospital in Anderlecht, Brussels
 Hôpital Universitaire Des Enfants Reine Fabiola, Laeken, Brussels
 Institut Jules Bordet, Brussels
 Saint-Pierre University Hospital, Brussels
 Ghent University Hospital in Ghent, East Flanders
 UZ Leuven, university hospital of KU Leuven in Flemish Brabant
 Hospitalier Universitaire de Charleroi in Charleroi
 Centre Hospitalier Universitaire Ambroise Paré in Mons
 Centre Hospitalier Universitaire Tivoli in La Louvière
 University Hospital Liège in Liège
 Centre Hospitalier Universitaire de Namur in Salzinnes (Namur), Mont-Godinne and Dinant

Brazil 
 Federal University of Brasília, University Hospital of Brasília, HUB, Brasília, Federal District
 Hospital of Base, Hospital de Base, HB, University Hospital, Brasília, Federal District
 Armed Forces Hospital, Hospital das Forças Armadas, HFA, University Hospital, Brasília, Federal District
 Federal University of São Paulo, São Paulo Hospital, São Paulo
 Clinics Hospital of the State University of Campinas, Campinas
 University of São Paulo, School of Medicine Clinics Hospital, São Paulo
 University of São Paulo, School of Medicine at Ribeirao Preto's Clinics Hospital, Ribeirão Preto
 Hospital de Clínicas de Porto Alegre, School of Medicine at the Federal University of Rio Grande do Sul, Porto Alegre, Rio Grande do Sul
 Hospital São Lucas, Pontifical Catholic University of Rio Grande do Sul, Porto Alegre, Rio Grande do Sul
 Federal University of Santa Catarina, Hospital Universitário Polydoro Ernani de São Thiago, Florianópolis, Santa Catarina

Canada

Alberta 

 Alberta Children's Hospital, Calgary, Alberta - University of Calgary Faculty of Medicine
 Foothills Hospital, Calgary, Alberta - University of Calgary Faculty of Medicine
 Tom Baker Cancer Centre
 Rockyview General Hospital, Calgary, Alberta - University of Calgary Faculty of Medicine
 Peter Lougheed Centre, Calgary, Alberta - University of Calgary Faculty of Medicine
 South Health Campus, Calgary, Alberta - University of Calgary Faculty of Medicine
 Alberta Hospital Edmonton, Edmonton, Alberta - University of Alberta Faculty of Medicine and Dentistry
 Cross Cancer Institute, Edmonton, Alberta - University of Alberta Faculty of Medicine and Dentistry
 Grey Nuns Community Hospital, Edmonton, Alberta - University of Alberta Faculty of Medicine and Dentistry
 Kaye Edmonton Clinic, Edmonton, Alberta - University of Alberta Faculty of Medicine and Dentistry
 Lois Hole Hospital for Women, Edmonton, Alberta - University of Alberta Faculty of Medicine and Dentistry 
 Misericordia Community Hospital, Edmonton, Alberta - University of Alberta Faculty of Medicine and Dentistry 
 Royal Alexandra Hospital, Edmonton, Alberta - University of Alberta Faculty of Medicine and Dentistry
 University of Alberta Hospital, Edmonton, Alberta - University of Alberta Faculty of Medicine and Dentistry
 Stollery Children's Hospital
 Queen Elizabeth II Hospital (Canada), Grande Prairie, Alberta - University of Alberta Faculty of Medicine and Dentistry
 Chinook Regional Hospital, Lethbridge, Alberta - University of Calgary Faculty of Medicine
 Medicine Hat Regional Hospital, Medicine Hat, Alberta - University of Calgary Faculty of Medicine
 Red Deer Regional Hospital, Red Deer, Alberta - University of Alberta Faculty of Medicine and Dentistry

British Columbia 

 Abbotsford Regional Hospital, Abbotsford, British Columbia - University of British Columbia
 Campbell River Hospital, Campbell River, British Columbia - University of British Columbia
 Chilliwack General Hospital, Chilliwack, British Columbia - University of British Columbia
 St Joseph's General Hospital, Comox, British Columbia - University of British Columbia
 Dawson Creek & District Hospital, Dawson Creek, British Columbia - University of British Columbia
 Cowichan District Hospital, Duncan, British Columbia - University of British Columbia
 Fort St. John Hospital, Fort St. John, British Columbia - University of British Columbia
 Royal Inland Hospital, Kamloops, British Columbia - University of British Columbia
 Kelowna General Hospital, Kelowna, British Columbia - University of British Columbia
 Nanaimo Regional General Hospital, Nanaimo, British Columbia - University of British Columbia
 Royal Columbian Hospital, New Westminster, British Columbia - University of British Columbia
 Lions Gate Hospital, North Vancouver, British Columbia
 Penticton Regional Hospital, Penticton, British Columbia - University of British Columbia
 University Hospital of Northern British Columbia, Prince George, British Columbia - University of British Columbia
 Richmond Hospital, Richmond, British Columbia - University of British Columbia
 Surrey Memorial Hospital, Surrey, British Columbia - University of British Columbia
 Terrace Mills Memorial Hospital, Terrace, British Columbia - University of British Columbia
 British Columbia Children's Hospital, Vancouver, British Columbia - University of British Columbia
 British Columbia Women's Hospital & Health Centre, Vancouver, British Columbia - University of British Columbia
 Providence Health Care (Vancouver), Vancouver, British Columbia - University of British Columbia
 St. Paul's Hospital
 Mount Saint Joseph Hospital
 St. Vincent's Hospitals
 Holy Family Hospital
 Youville Residence
 St John Hospice
 Vancouver Hospital and Health Sciences Centre, Vancouver, British Columbia - University of British Columbia
 Vancouver General Hospital
 UBC Hospital
 Vernon Jubilee Hospital, Vernon, British Columbia - University of British Columbia
 Royal Jubilee Hospital, Victoria, British Columbia - University of British Columbia
 Victoria General Hospital, Victoria, British Columbia - University of British Columbia

Manitoba 
 Health Sciences Centre (Winnipeg)
 Winnipeg General Hospital
 The Children's Hospital of Winnipeg
 CancerCare Manitoba
 PsycHealth Centre
 Respiratory & Rehabilitation Hospital
 Women’s Hospital (Winnipeg)
 St. Boniface General Hospital (Winnipeg)

New Brunswick 
 Dr. Everett Chalmers Hospital, Fredericton, New Brunswick - Dalhousie University Faculty of Medicine
 Dr. Georges-L.-Dumont University Hospital Centre, Moncton, New Brunswick - Faculté de médecine – Université de Sherbrooke
 Moncton Hospital, Moncton, New Brunswick - Dalhousie University Faculty of Medicine
 Saint John Regional Hospital, Saint John, New Brunswick - Dalhousie University Faculty of Medicine

Newfoundland and Labrador 
 Janeway Children's Health and Rehabilitation Centre, St. John's, NL

Northwest Territories 
 Stanton Regional Hospital, Yellowknife - partners with University of Calgary and the University of Alberta

Nova Scotia 
 South Shore Regional Hospital, Bridgewater, Nova Scotia - Dalhousie University Faculty of Medicine
 Nova Scotia Hospital, Dartmouth, Nova Scotia - Dalhousie University Faculty of Medicine
 Dartmouth General Hospital, Dartmouth, Nova Scotia - Dalhousie University Faculty of Medicine
 IWK Health Centre, Halifax - Dalhousie University Faculty of Medicine
 Queen Elizabeth II Health Sciences Centre, Halifax - Dalhousie University Faculty of Medicine
 Valley Regional Hospital, Kentville, Nova Scotia - Dalhousie University Faculty of Medicine
 Cobequid Community Health Centre, Lower Sackville, NS - Dalhousie University Faculty of Medicine
 Cape Breton Regional Hospital, Sydney, Nova Scotia - Dalhousie University Faculty of Medicine
 Colchester Regional Hospital, Truro, Nova Scotia - Dalhousie University Faculty of Medicine
 Hants Community Hospital, Windsor, Nova Scotia - Dalhousie University Faculty of Medicine

Ontario 
 South Muskoka Memorial Hospital, Bracebridge, Ontario (Northern Ontario School of Medicine)
 Joseph Brant Hospital, Burlington, Ontario (McMaster University)
 LaVerendrye Hospital, Fort Frances, Ontario (Northern Ontario School of Medicine)
 Hamilton General Hospital, Hamilton, Ontario (McMaster University)
 Juravinski Cancer Centre, Hamilton, Ontario (McMaster University)
 Juravinski Hospital, Hamilton, Ontario (McMaster University)
 McMaster Children's Hospital, Hamilton, Ontario (McMaster University)
 McMaster University Medical Centre, Hamilton, Ontario (McMaster University)
 St. Joseph's Healthcare Hamilton, Hamilton, Ontario (McMaster University)
 St. Peter's Hospital (Hamilton), Hamilton, Ontario (McMaster University)
 Huntsville District Memorial Hospital, Huntsville, Ontario (Northern Ontario School of Medicine)
 Lake of the Woods District Hospital, Kenora, Ontario (Northern Ontario School of Medicine)
 Kingston General Hospital, Kingston, Ontario (Queen's University at Kingston)
 Hotel Dieu Hospital (Kingston, Ontario), Kingston, Ontario (Queen's University at Kingston)
 Providence Continuing Care Centre, Kingston, Ontario (Queen's University at Kingston)
 Grand River Hospital, Kitchener, Ontario (McMaster University)
 St. Mary's General Hospital, Kitchener, Ontario (McMaster University)
 University Hospital (London, Ontario) (University of Western Ontario)
 Victoria Hospital (London, Ontario) (University of Western Ontario)
 Temiskaming Hospital, New Liskeard (Northern Ontario School of Medicine)
 North Bay General Hospital, North Bay, Ontario (Northern Ontario School of Medicine)
 Children's Hospital of Eastern Ontario, Ottawa, Ontario (University of Ottawa)
 Montfort Hospital, Ottawa, Ontario (University of Ottawa)
Sisters of Charity of Ottawa, Ottawa, Ontario (University of Ottawa)
The Ottawa Hospital, Ottawa, Ontario (University of Ottawa)
 West Parry Sound Health Centre, Parry Sound, Ontario (Northern Ontario School of Medicine)
 Sault Area Hospital, Sault Ste. Marie, Ontario (Northern Ontario School of Medicine)
 Lookout Meno Ya Win Health Centre, Sioux Lookout, Ontario (Northern Ontario School of Medicine)
 Health Sciences North, Sudbury, Ontario (Northern Ontario School of Medicine)
 Thunder Bay Regional Health Sciences Centre, Thunder Bay, Ontario (Northern Ontario School of Medicine)
 Timmins and District Hospital, Timmins, Ontario (Northern Ontario School of Medicine)
 Baycrest, Toronto, Ontario (University of Toronto)
 Centre for Addiction and Mental Health, Toronto, Ontario (University of Toronto)
 Hospital for Sick Children, Toronto, Ontario (University of Toronto)
 Markham Stouffville Hospital, Markham, Ontario - beginning 2010 (University of Toronto)
 Mount Sinai Hospital, Toronto, Toronto, Ontario (University of Toronto)
 North York General Hospital, Toronto, Ontario (University of Toronto)
 Princess Margaret Cancer Centre, Toronto, Ontario (University of Toronto)
 St. John's Rehab Hospital, Toronto, Ontario (University of Toronto)
 St. Michael's Hospital, Toronto (University of Toronto)
 Sunnybrook Health Sciences Centre, Toronto, Ontario (University of Toronto)
 Toronto East General Hospital (University of Toronto)
 Toronto General Hospital (University of Toronto)
 Toronto Rehabilitation Institute, Toronto, Ontario (University of Toronto)
 Toronto Western Hospital (University of Toronto)
 Women's College Hospital, Toronto, Ontario (University of Toronto)

Prince Edward Island 
Queen Elizabeth Hospital, Charlottetown, Prince Edward Island - Dalhousie University Faculty of Medicine

Quebec 
 Centre hospitalier de l'Université de Montréal, Montreal, Quebec
 Centre hospitalier universitaire Sainte-Justine, Montreal, Quebec
 Douglas Hospital, Montreal, Quebec
 Hôpital Maisonneuve-Rosemont (Université de Montréal), Montreal, Quebec
 Hôpital du Sacré-Cœur de Montréal, Montreal, Quebec
 Institut Philippe-Pinel de Montréal (Université de Montréal), Montreal, Quebec
 Institut universitaire en santé mentale de Montréal (Université de Montréal)
 Jewish General Hospital (McGill University), Montreal, Quebec
 McGill University Health Centre (McGill University), Montreal, Quebec
 St. Mary's Hospital (McGill University), Montreal, Quebec
 Centre hospitalier universitaire de Québec - Centre hospitalier de l'Université Laval, Quebec City, Quebec 
Hôpital Saint-François d'Assise, Quebec City, Quebec 
Hôtel-Dieu de Québec, Quebec City, Quebec 
Centre hospitalier de l'Université Laval, Quebec City, Quebec
 Centre hospitalier universitaire de Sherbrooke (Université de Sherbrooke), Sherbrooke

Saskatchewan 
 Regional Psychiatric Centre, Saskatoon, Saskatchewan
 Royal University Hospital, Saskatoon, Saskatchewan

Chile 
 Hospital Clínico de la Pontificia Universidad Católica de Chile, Pontifical Catholic University of Chile
 Hospital Dr. Hernán Henríquez Aravena, University of La Frontera
 Hospital Clínico de la Universidad de Chile, University of Chile
 Hospital Clínico Viña del Mar, National University Andres Bello
 Hospital Clínico Instituto de Seguridad del Trabajo, in Viña del Mar
 Hospital Clínico Herminda Martin, in Chillán

China

Guangzhou 
  Third Affiliated Hospital of Sun Yat Sen University, Guangzhou, Canton

Hebei 
  Third Hospital of Hebei Medical University, Shijiazhuang, Hebei

Hubei 
 Wuhan Union Hospital, Tongji Medical College, Wuhan
 Wuhan Tongji Hospital, Tongji Medical College, Wuhan

Nanjing 
 Jiangsu Province hospital, Nanjing First Affiliated Hospital, Nanjing Medical University
Nanjing Brain Hospital, Nanjing Medical University

Shanghai 
Affiliated with Shanghai Medical College, Fudan University
 Children's Hospital of Fudan University
 Eye and ENT Hospital of Fudan University
 Huadong Hospital
 Huashan Hospital
 Shanghai Cancer Center
 Shanghai Fifth People's Hospital
 Zhongshan Hospital

Affiliated with School of Medicine, Shanghai Jiao Tong University
 Shanghai First People's Hospital
 Shanghai Third People's Hospital
 Shanghai Sixth People's Hospital
 Shanghai Ninth People's Hospital
 Renji Hospital
 Ruijin Hospital
 Shanghai Chest Hospital
 Shanghai Children's Hospital
 Shanghai Children's Medical Center
 Shanghai Mental Health Center
 Xinhua Hospital

Sichuan 
 Sichuan University Hospitals

Wenzhou 
 First Affiliated Hospital, Wenzhou Medical University
 Second Affiliated Hospital, Wenzhou Medical University

Zhejiang 
 First Affiliated Hospital, Zhejiang University School of Medicine
 Second Affiliated Hospital, Zhejiang University School of Medicine
 Sir Run Run Shaw Hospital, Zhejiang University School of Medicine
 Children's Hospital, Zhejiang University School of Medicine
 Women's Hospital, Zhejiang University School of Medicine
 Zhejiang Stomatology Hospital, Zhejiang University School of Medicine

Colombia 
Clínica Universitaria Teletón, Bogotá
Hospital Militar Central, Bogota
Hospital Infantil Universitario de San José, Bogotá
Hospital Universitario Nacional de Colombia, Bogotá
Hospital San Juan de Dios, Bogotá
Hospital Universitario del Valle, Cali
Hospital Universitario Fundación Santa fé, Bogotá
Hospital Universitario de la Samaritana (HUS), Bogotá
Hospital Universitario San Ignacio (HUSI), Bogotá
Hospital Universitario San Vicente de Paul (HUSVP), Medellín
Hospital Universitario de Santander, Bucaramanga
Hospital Universitario de Bucaramanga, Bucaramanga
Instituto Nacional de Cancerologia, Bogota
Clínica Universitaria Colombia - Colsanitas, Bogotá

Czechia 
Fakultní nemocnice v Motole, Prague
Všeobecná fakultní nemocnice v Praze, Prague
Fakultní nemocnice Královské Vinohrady, Prague
Fakultní Thomayerova Nemocnice, Prague
Fakultní nemocnice Olomouc, Olomouc
Fakultní nemocnice Hradec Králové, Hradec Králové
Fakultní nemocnice Plzeň, Plzeň
Fakultní nemocnice Ostrava, Ostrava
Fakultní nemocnice Brno, Brno
Fakultní nemocnice u sv. Anny v Brně, Brno

Denmark 
Aalborg University Hospital, Aalborg
Aarhus University Hospital, Århus
Rigshospitalet, Copenhagen
Odense University Hospital, Odense

Egypt

Cairo 
 Al Azhar University Hospitals (Al Hussien Hospital) and (Sayed Galal Hospital)
 Ain Shams University Hospital (El-Demerdash Hospital)
 Kasr El Aini Hospital
 National Cancer Institute Egypt
 Theodor Bilharz Research Institute
 Souaad Kafafi University Hospital, Misr University for Science and Technology College of Medicine

Alexandria 
 Alexandria University Hospitals
 Medical research institute university hospital
 The Suzanne Mubarak Regional Centre for Women's Health and Development

Assiut 
 Assiut University Hospital

Beni-Suef 
 Beni-Suef University Hospital

Fayoum 
Fayoum University Hospital

Ismailia 
 Suez Canal University Hospital
 Ismailia Teaching oncology hospital

Kafrelsheikh 
 Kafrelsheikh University Hospital

Mansoura 
 Mansoura University Hospital

Minufiya 
 Minufiya University Hospital

Sohag 
 South Valley University Hospital

Tanta 
 Tanta University Hospital

Aswan 
 Aswan University Hospital

Estonia
 Tartu University Clinic, University of Tartu

Finland

 Helsinki University Central Hospital (HUS), University of Helsinki
 Kuopio University Hospital (KYS), University of Eastern Finland
 Oulu University Hospital (OYS), University of Oulu
 Tampere University Hospital (TAYS), University of Tampere
 Turku University Hospital (TYKS), University of Turku

France

Note: Centre hospitalier universitaire is often abbreviated CHU.
 Centre hospitalier universitaire d'Amiens, Amiens, France - University of Picardie Jules Verne
 Centre hospitalier universitaire d'Angers, Angers, France - University of Angers
 Centre hospitalier universitaire de Besançon
Jean Minjoz Hospital, Besançon - University of Franche-Comté
Hôpital Saint-Jacques Besançon - University of Franche-Comté
 Centre hospitalier universitaire de Bordeaux, Bordeaux, France - University of Bordeaux
 Centre hospitalier universitaire de Brest, Brest, France - University of Western Brittany
 Centre hospitalier régional universitaire de Caen, Caen, France - University of Caen Lower Normandy
 Centre hospitalier universitaire de Clermont-Ferrand, Clermont-Ferrand, France - University of Auvergne
 Centre hospitalier universitaire de Dijon, Dijon, France - University of Burgundy 
 Centre hospitalier universitaire de Fort-de-France, Fort-de-France
 Grenoble University Hospital Centre, Grenoble - University of Grenoble
 Centre hospitalier régional universitaire de Lille, Lille, France - University of Lille II
 Centre hospitalier régional universitaire de Limoges, Limoges, France - University of Limoges
 Hospices civils de Lyon, Lyon, France - Claude Bernard University Lyon 1
 Assistance publique - Hôpitaux de Marseille (AP-HM) - Aix-Marseille University
 Hôpital de la Timone, Marseille, France 
 Hôpital Nord, Marseille, France
 Centre hospitalier universitaire de Montpellier, Montpellier, France
 Centre hospitalier régional et universitaire de Nancy, Nancy, France - Henri Poincaré University
 Centre hospitalier universitaire de Nantes, Nantes, France - Nantes University
 Centre hospitalier universitaire de Nice, Nice, France - University of Nice Sophia Antipolis 
 Centre hospitalier universitaire de Nimes, Nimes, France
 Assistance publique – Hôpitaux de Paris (AP-HP)
 Groupe hospitalier Hôpitaux universitaires Henri-Mondor
 Centre hospitalier universitaire Henri-Mondor
 Hôpital Albert-Chenevier
 Hôpital Émile-Roux
 Hôpital Joffre-Dupuytren
 Hôpital Georges-Clemenceau
 Groupe hospitalier hôpitaux universitaires Pitié-Salpêtrière - Charles Foix
 Pitié-Salpêtrière Hospital
 Hôpital Charles-Foix
 Groupe hospitalier hôpitaux universitares Saint Louis - Lariboisière - Fernand Widal
 Hôpital Saint-Louis
 Lariboisière Hospital
 Hôpital Fernand-Widal
 Groupe hospitalier hôpital universitaire Necker-Enfants Malades
 Groupe hospitalier hôpital universitaire Robert-Debré
 Groupe hospitalier Hôpitaux universitaires Est Parisien
 Hôpital Tenon
 Hôpital Saint-Antoine
 Hôpital Rothschild
 Hôpital Armand-Trousseau
 Hôpital de La Roche-Guyon
 Groupe hospitalier hôpitaux universitaires Paris Centre
 Hôpital Cochin
 Hôtel-Dieu de Paris
 Hôpital Broca
 Groupe hospitalier hôpitaux universitaires Paris Île-de-France Ouest
 Raymond Poincaré University Hospital
 Hôpital maritime de Berck
 Hôpital Ambroise-Paré (Boulogne-Billancourt)
 Groupe Hospitalier hôpitaux universitaires Paris Nord Val de Seine
 Hôpital Bichat-Claude-Bernard
 Beaujon Hospital
 Hôpital Louis-Mourier
 Hôpital Bretonneau
 Hôpital Adélaïde-Hautval
 Groupe hospitalier Hôpitaux universitaires Paris Ouest
 Hôpital Européen Georges-Pompidou
 Hôpital Corentin-Celton
 Hôpital Vaugirard - Gabriel-Pallez
 Groupe hospitalier hôpitaux universitaires Paris-Seine-Saint-Denis
 Avicenne Hospital
 Hôpital Jean-Verdier
 Hôpital René-Muret-Bigottini
 Sainte-Périne - Rossini - Chardon-Lagache Hospital
 Groupe hospitalier hôpitaux universitaires Paris-Sud
 Bicêtre Hospital
 Hôpital Paul-Brousse
 Hôpital Antoine-Béclère
 Institut Gustave Roussy, Villejuif
 Val-de-Grâce (Hôpital d'instruction des armées du Val-de-Grâce or HIA Val-de-Grâce), Paris
 Centre hospitalier universitaire de Pointe-à-Pitre, Pointe-à-Pitre
 Centre hospitalier universitaire de Poitiers, Poitiers, France - University of Poitiers
 Centre hospitalier universitaire de Reims, Reims, France - University of Reims Champagne-Ardenne
 Centre hospitalier universitaire de Rennes, Rennes, France - University of Rennes 1
 Centre hospitalier universitaire de La Réunion, Saint-Denis, Réunion
 Centre hospitalier universitaire de Rouen, Rouen, France - University of Rouen 
 Centre hospitalier universitaire de Saint-Étienne
 Hôpitaux universitaires de Strasbourg, Strasbourg, France - Strasbourg University
 Centre hospitalier universitaire de Toulouse, Toulouse, France - Paul Sabatier University
 Centre hospitalier régional universitaire de Tours, Tours, France - Francois R

Germany

Baden-Württemberg 

 Universitätsklinikum Freiburg, Freiburg
 Universitätsklinikum Heidelberg, Heidelberg
Psychiatrische Universitätsklinik Heidelberg
 Universitätsmedizin Mannheim, Mannheim
 Universitätsklinikum Tübingen, Tübingen
 Universitätsklinikum Ulm, Ulm
RKU – Universitäts- und Rehabilitationskliniken Ulm (University of Ulm)
Acura-Rheumazentrum Baden-Baden, Baden-Baden (Heidelberg University)
Klinikum Mittelbaden Baden-Baden Balg, Baden-Baden (Heidelberg University)
Universitäts-Herzzentrum Freiburg-Bad Krozingen (University of Freiburg)
Caritas-Krankenhaus Bad Mergentheim, Bad Mergentheim (University of Würzburg)
Vulpius Klinik, Bad Rappenau (Heidelberg University)
Fachklinik für Neurologie Dietenbronn (University of Ulm)
Zentrum für Psychiatrie Emmendingen (University of Freiburg)
Klinikum Esslingen, Esslingen am Neckar (University of Tübingen)
Krankenhaus Freudenstadt, Freudenstadt (University of Tübingen)
Klinikum Friedrichshafen, Friedrichshafen (University of Tübingen)
Agaplesion Bethanien Krankenhaus Heidelberg (Heidelberg University)
SRH Kurpfalzkrankenhaus Heidelberg (Heidelberg University)
Nationales Centrum für Tumorerkrankungen, Heidelberg (Heidelberg University)
SRH Klinikum Karlsbad-Langensteinbach, Karlsbad (Baden) (Heidelberg University)
Diakonissenkrankenhaus Karlsruhe-Rüppurr, Karlsruhe (University of Freiburg)
St. Vincentius-Kliniken, Karlsruhe (University of Freiburg)
Städtisches Klinikum Karlsruhe, Karlsruhe (University of Freiburg)
Kreiskrankenhaus Lörrach, Lörrach (University of Freiburg)
Diakonissenkrankenhaus Mannheim (Heidelberg University)
Theresienkrankenhaus und St. Hedwig-Klinik Mannheim (Heidelberg University)
Neckar-Odenwald-Kliniken, Mosbach (Heidelberg University)
Krankenhaus St. Elisabeth, Ravensburg (University of Ulm)
Diakonie-Klinikum Schwäbisch Hall, Schwäbisch Hall (Heidelberg University)
Robert-Bosch-Hospital, Stuttgart (University of Tübingen)
Diakonie-Klinikum Stuttgart, Stuttgart (University of Tübingen)
Karl-Olga Hospital, Stuttgart (University of Ulm)
Klinikum Stuttgart (University of Tübingen)
Bürgerhospital
Katharinenhospital 
Krankenhaus Bad Cannstatt
Olgahospital 
Marienhospital Stuttgart (University of Tübingen)
Klinikum Landkreis Tuttlingen, Tuttlingen and Spaichingen (University of Freiburg)
Bundeswehrkrankenhaus Ulm, Ulm (University of Ulm)
Schwarzwald-Baar Klinikum Villingen-Schwenningen (University of Freiburg)
GRN-Klinik Weinheim, Weinheim (Heidelberg University)
Klinikum am Weissenhof, Weinsberg (Heidelberg University)
Psychiatrisches Zentrum Nordbaden, Wiesloch (Heidelberg University)
Spitäler Hochrhein (University of Freiburg)
Ortenau Klinikum
Ortenau Klinikum Lahr-Ettenheim (University of Freiburg)
Ortenau Klinikum Offenburg-Gengenbach (University of Freiburg)
Kliniken Landkreis Biberach (University of Ulm)
Kreisklinik Biberach, Biberach an der Riss
District Clinic Laupheim, Laupheim
District Hospital Ochsenhausen, Ochsenhausen
District Hospital Riedlingen, Riedlingen

Bavaria 
 Universitätsklinikum Erlangen, Erlangen
Psychiatrische Universitätsklinik Erlangen, Erlangen 
Klinikum der Universität München, Munich
Klinikum Innenstadt 
Klinikum Großhadern
Dr. von Hauner Children's Hospital
 Rechts der Isar Hospital, Munich
Helios Klinikum München West - Klinikum München Pasing (Ludwig Maximilian University of Munich)
 Universitätsklinikum Regensburg, Regensburg
 Universitätsklinikum Würzburg, Würzburg
Klinikum St. Marien Amberg, Amberg (University of Erlangen-Nuremberg and University of Regensburg)
Augsburg Hospital, Augsburg (Ludwig Maximilian University of Munich)
Augsburg Hospital Sud, Augsburg (Ludwig Maximilian University of Munich)
Bezirkskrankenhaus Augsburg, Augsburg (Ludwig Maximilian University of Munich)
Josefinum, Augsburg (Ludwig Maximilian University of Munich)
Bayreuth Medical Center, Bayreuth (University of Erlangen-Nuremberg)
Bezirkskrankenhaus Bayreuth, Bayreuth (University of Erlangen-Nuremberg)
Klinikum Coburg, Coburg (University of Würzburg)
Klinikum Landkreis Erding, Erding (Technical University of Munich)
Waldkrankenhaus St. Marien, Erlangen (University of Erlangen-Nuremberg)
Klinikum Freising, Freising (Technical University of Munich)
Klinikum Fürth, Fürth (University of Erlangen-Nuremberg)
German Center for Pediatric and Adolescent Rheumatology, Garmisch-Partenkirchen (Ludwig Maximilian University of Munich)
Klinikum Kaufbeuren, Kaufbeuren (Ludwig Maximilian University of Munich)
Bezirkskrankenhaus Kempten, Kempten (University of Ulm)
Klinikum Kempten, Kempten (University of Ulm)
Klinikum Landshut, Landshut (Ludwig Maximilian University of Munich)
Klinikum Memmingen, Memmingen (Ludwig Maximilian University of Munich)
Deutsches Herzzentrum München, Munich (Technical University of Munich)
Frauenklinik an der Maistraße, Munich (Ludwig Maximilian University of Munich)
Kbo-Heckscher-Klinikum, Munich (Ludwig Maximilian University of Munich)
Klinik Augustinum München, Munich (Ludwig Maximilian University of Munich)
Klinikum Bogenhausen, Munich (Technical University of Munich)
Klinikum Harlaching, Munich (Ludwig Maximilian University of Munich) 
Klinikum Neuperlach, Munich (Ludwig Maximilian University of Munich) 
Krankenhaus Barmherzige Brüder, Munich (Technical University of Munich)
Krankenhaus Martha Maria, Munich (Ludwig Maximilian University of Munich) 
Klinikum Schwabing, Munich (Ludwig Maximilian University of Munich and Technical University of Munich) 
Klinik Thalkirchner Straße, Munich (Ludwig Maximilian University of Munich)
Maria-Theresia-Klinik, Munich (Ludwig Maximilian University of Munich)
Rotkreuzklinikum München, Munich (Technical University of Munich)
Berufsgenossenschaftliche Unfallklinik Murnau, Murnau am Staffelsee (Technical University of Munich)
Klinikum Neumarkt in der Oberpfalz, Neumarkt in der Oberpfalz (University of Erlangen-Nuremberg)
Klinikum Nürnberg, Nuremberg (Paracelsus Medical University)
St. Theresien-Krankenhaus Nürnberg, Nuremberg (University of Erlangen-Nuremberg)
Klinikum Passau, Passau (University of Regensburg)
Bezirksklinikum Regensburg, Regensburg (University of Regensburg)
Caritas-Krankenhaus St. Josef Regensburg, Regensburg (University of Regensburg)
Krankenhaus Barmherzige Brüder, Regensburg (University of Regensburg)
Stadtkrankenhaus Schwabach, Schwabach (University of Erlangen-Nuremberg)
Leopoldina-Krankenhaus Schweinfurt, Schweinfurt (University of Würzburg)
Klinikum Traunstein, Traunstein (Ludwig Maximilian University of Munich)
Inn-Salzach-Klinikum, Wasserburg am Inn (Ludwig Maximilian University of Munich)
Kreisklinik Wörth an der Donau, Wörth an der Donau (University of Regensburg)
Stiftung Juliusspital Würzburg, Würzburg (University of Würzburg)

Berlin 
 Charité – Universitätsmedizin Berlin, Berlin:
 Campus Benjamin Franklin (CBF), Berlin-Steglitz
 Campus Berlin-Buch (CBB), Berlin-Buch
 Charité Campus Mitte (CCM), Berlin-Mitte
 Campus Virchow-Klinikum (CVK), Berlin-Wedding
Bundeswehrkrankenhaus Berlin, Berlin (Charité – Universitätsmedizin Berlin)
Deutsches Herzzentrum Berlin
Evangelische Lungenklinik Berlin, Berlin (Charité – Universitätsmedizin Berlin)
Evangelisches Krankenhaus Königin Elisabeth Herzberge, Berlin (Charité – Universitätsmedizin Berlin)
Evangelisches Waldkrankenhaus Spandau, Berlin (Humboldt University of Berlin)
Jüdisches Krankenhaus Berlin, Berlin (Charité – Universitätsmedizin Berlin)
Krankenhaus Hedwigshöhe, Berlin (Charité – Universitätsmedizin Berlin)
Krankenhaus Köpenick, Berlin (Charité – Universitätsmedizin Berlin)
Krankenhaus Waldfriede, Berlin (Charité – Universitätsmedizin Berlin)
Martin-Luther-Krankenhaus, Berlin (Charité – Universitätsmedizin Berlin) 
Oskar-Ziethen-Krankenhaus, Berlin (Charité – Universitätsmedizin Berlin)
Park-Klinik Weißensee, Berlin (Charité – Universitätsmedizin Berlin)
Rudolf-Virchow-Krankenhaus, Berlin (Charité – Universitätsmedizin Berlin)
Sankt-Gertrauden-Krankenhaus, Berlin (Charité – Universitätsmedizin Berlin)
St. Hedwig-Krankenhaus, Berlin (Charité – Universitätsmedizin Berlin)
St. Joseph Krankenhaus Berlin-Tempelhof, Berlin (Free University of Berlin)
Schlosspark-Klinik, Berlin (Free University of Berlin)
Unfallkrankenhaus Berlin, Berlin (Charité – Universitätsmedizin Berlin and University of Greifswald)
Vivantes Auguste-Viktoria-Klinikum Berlin, Berlin (Charité – Universitätsmedizin Berlin)
Vivantes Klinikum im Friedrichshain, Berlin (Charité – Universitätsmedizin Berlin)
Vivantes Klinikum Am Urban, Berlin (Charité – Universitätsmedizin Berlin)
Vivantes Humboldt-Klinikum, Berlin (Charité – Universitätsmedizin Berlin)
Vivantes Klinikum Kaulsdorf, Berlin (Charité – Universitätsmedizin Berlin)
Vivantes Klinikum Neukölln, Berlin (Charité – Universitätsmedizin Berlin)

Brandenburg 
 Immanuel Klinikum Bernau, Bernau bei Berlin (Medical University of Brandenburg)
 Klinikum Brandenburg, Brandenburg an der Havel (Medical University of Brandenburg)
Carl-Thiem-Klinikum Cottbus, Cottbus (Charité – Universitätsmedizin Berlin, Martin Luther University of Halle-Wittenberg, TU Dresden)
 Ruppiner Kliniken, Neuruppin (Medical University of Brandenburg)
Klinikum Ernst von Bergmann Potsdam, Potsdam (Charité – Universitätsmedizin Berlin)
Werner-Forßmann-Krankenhaus, Eberswalde (Charité – Universitätsmedizin Berlin)

Bremen 
 Klinikum Bremerhaven, Bremerhaven (Georg-August-University Göttingen)
 Klinikum Bremen-Mitte (Georg-August-University Göttingen)
 Klinikum Bremen-Nord (University of Hamburg)
 Klinikum Bremen-Ost (Georg-August-University Göttingen)
 Klinikum Links der Weser (Georg-August-University Göttingen)
 Rotes Kreuz Krankenhaus Bremen (Hannover Medical School)
 St. Joseph-Stift Bremen (Georg-August-University Göttingen)

Hamburg 
 University Medical Center Hamburg-Eppendorf, (Universitätsklinikum Hamburg-Eppendorf (UKE)). Hamburg
Altona Children's Hospital
Helios Endo-Klinik Hamburg, University of Hamburg
Helios Mariahilf Klinik Hamburg, University of Hamburg
Israelitisches Krankenhaus Hamburg, University of Hamburg
Marienkrankenhaus Hamburg, University of Hamburg
BG Klinikum Hamburg
Schön Klinik Hamburg Eilbek, University of Hamburg
Asklepios Kliniken Hamburg, University of Hamburg
Asklepios Clinic St. Georg
Asklepios Klinik Wandsbek
Asklepios Klinik Barmbek
Asklepios Klinik Nord
Asklepios Klinik Altona, Altona, Hamburg
Asklepios Klinikum Harburg
Asklepios Westklinikum Hamburg (University of Kiel)

Hessen 
 Universitätsklinikum Frankfurt am Main, Frankfurt
Klinikum Bad Hersfeld (Academic Teaching Hospital of Justus Liebig University Giessen)
Klinikum Darmstadt, Darmstadt (Heidelberg University, Johann Wolfgang Goethe University Frankfurt am Main)
Klinikum Fulda, Fulda (University of Marburg)
Klinikum Kassel, Kassel (University of Marburg)
Horst-Schmidt-Kliniken, Wiesbaden (Johannes Gutenberg University Mainz)
Asklepios Klinik Lich (Academic Teaching Hospital of Justus Liebig University Giessen)
Asklepios Paulinen Clinic Wiesbaden (Johann Wolfgang Goethe University Frankfurt am Main)
Asklepios Clinic Seligenstadt (Johann Wolfgang Goethe University Frankfurt am Main)
Asklepios Klinik Langen (Johann Wolfgang Goethe University Frankfurt am Main)
Asklepios Kliniken Bad Wildungen (University of Marburg)
Asklepios Klinik Melsungen (University of Marburg)
Asklepios Klinik Schwalmstadt (University of Marburg)
 Universitätsklinikum Gießen und Marburg
 Campus Gießen, Gießen
 Campus Marburg, Marburg

Mecklenburg-Vorpommern 
 Greifswald University Hospital, University of Greifswald, Greifswald
 Universitätsklinikum Rostock, Rostock
Helios Kliniken Schwerin, Schwerin (University of Rostock)

Lower Saxony 
 Universitätsklinikum Göttingen, Göttingen
Klinikum der Medizinischen Hochschule Hannover (Hannover Medical School)
 Kinderkrankenhaus auf der Built, Hannover (Hannover Medical School)
KRH Klinikum Nordstadt, Hannover (Hannover Medical School)
Dr. Herbert Nieper Hospital Goslar (Georg August University Göttingen)
Fritz-König-Stift Bad Harzburg (Georg-August-University Göttingen)
Asklepios Fachklinikum Göttingen (Georg-August-University Göttingen)
Asklepios Fachklinikum Tiefenbrunn (Georg-August-University Göttingen)
Asklepios Kliniken Schildautal Seesen (Georg-August-University Göttingen)

North Rhine-Westphalia 
 Universitätsklinikum Aachen, Aachen
 University Hospitals of the Ruhr-University of Bochum, Bochum, Herne and Bad Oeynhausen
Bergmannsheil University Hospitals, Bochum
 St. Josef-Hospital Bochum, Bochum 
St. Elisabeth-Hospital Bochum
Augusta-Kranken-Anstalt Bochum (University of Duisburg-Essen)
Universitätsklinikum Bonn, Bonn
 Universitätsklinikum Düsseldorf, Düsseldorf
Universitäts-Augenklinik Düsseldorf
 Universitätsklinikum Essen, Essen
 Universitätsklinikum Köln, Cologne
Kliniken der Stadt Köln
Krankenhaus Köln-Merheim, Cologne (University of Cologne and Witten/Herdecke University)
Krankenhaus Köln-Holweide, Cologne (University of Cologne)
Kinderkrankenhaus Amsterdamer Straße, Cologne (University of Cologne)
 Helios Klinikum Krefeld, Krefeld (RWTH Aachen University)
Universitätsklinikum Münster, Münster
Bodenseeklinik, Lindau
Klinikum am Weissenhof, Weinsberg (Heidelberg University)
Asklepios Children's Hospital Sankt Augustin (University of Bonn)
DRK-Kinderklinik Siegen, Siegen (University of Marburg)
Helios Klinikum Niederberg, Velbert (University of Duisburg-Essen)
Helios Universitätsklinikum Wuppertal, Wuppertal (Witten/Herdecke University)

Rhineland-Palatinate 
 Klinikum der Johannes Gutenberg-Universität Mainz, Mainz
Berufsgenossenschaftliche Unfallklinik Ludwigshafen, Ludwigshafen (Heidelberg University)
Klinikum der Stadt Ludwigshafen, Ludwigshafen (Johannes Gutenberg University Mainz and Heidelberg University)
Evangelisches Stift St. Martin Koblenz, Koblenz (Johannes Gutenberg University Mainz)
Bundeswehrzentralkrankenhaus Koblenz, Koblenz (Johannes Gutenberg University Mainz)
Katholisches Klinikum Koblenz-Montabaur, Koblenz (Johannes Gutenberg University Mainz)

Saarland 
 Universitätsklinikum des Saarlandes, Homburg

Saxony 
 Universitätsklinikum Dresden, Dresden
 Universitätsklinikum Leipzig, Leipzig
Klinikum St. Georg, Leipzig
Park-Klinikum Leipzig (Leipzig University)
Herzzentrum Leipzig (Leipzig University)
Klinikum Chemnitz, Chemnitz (Leipzig University, Dresden University of Technology)

Saxony-Anhalt 
 Berufsgenossenschaftliche Kliniken Bergmannstrost Halle, University of Halle-Wittenberg
 Universitätsklinikum Halle, Halle, University of Halle-Wittenberg
 Universitätsklinikum Magdeburg, Otto-von-Guericke University, Magdeburg
Asklepios-Klinik, Weißenfels, University of Halle-Wittenberg

Schleswig-Holstein 
 Universitätsklinikum Schleswig-Holstein
 Campus Lübeck, Lübeck
 Campus Kiel, Kiel

Thuringia 
 Universitätsklinikum Jena, Friedrich Schiller University of Jena
Zentralklinik Bad Berka, Bad Berka - Friedrich Schiller University of Jena
Klinikum Altenburger Land, Altenburg and Schmölln - Friedrich Schiller University of Jena & Leipzig University
Robert-Koch-Krankenhaus Apolda, Apolda - Friedrich Schiller University of Jena
St. Georg Klinikum Eisenach, Eisenach - Friedrich Schiller University of Jena
Waldkliniken Eisenberg, Eisenberg, Thuringia - Friedrich Schiller University of Jena
Helios Klinikum Erfurt, Erfurt - Friedrich Schiller University of Jena
Katholisches Krankenhaus Erfurt, Erfurt - Friedrich Schiller University of Jena
Klinikum Bad Salzungen, Bad Salzungen - Friedrich Schiller University of Jena
SRH Wald-Klinikum Gera, Gera - Friedrich Schiller University of Jena 
Helios Kreiskrankenhaus Gotha/Ohrdruf, Gotha - Friedrich Schiller University of Jena 
Kreiskrankenhaus Greiz, Greiz - Friedrich Schiller University of Jena 
Helios Fachkliniken Hildburghausen, Hildburghausen - Friedrich Schiller University of Jena
Helios Klinikum Meiningen, Meiningen - Friedrich Schiller University of Jena
Ökumenisches Hainich-Klinikum Mühlhausen - Friedrich Schiller University of Jena
Südharz Klinikum Nordhausen, Nordhausen - Friedrich Schiller University of Jena & Martin Luther University of Halle-Wittenberg
Thüringen-Kliniken „Georgius Agricola“ (Pößneck, Rudolstadt, Saalfeld) - Friedrich Schiller University of Jena 
SRH Zentralklinikum Suhl, Suhl - Friedrich Schiller University of Jena
Sophien- und Hufeland-Klinikum Weimar, Weimar - Friedrich Schiller University of Jena

Greece 
 University General Hospital "ATTIKON" - Athens
 University General Hospital of Heraklion "PAGNI" - Heraklion, Crete
 University Hospital of Ioannina - Ioannina
 University Hospital of Larissa - Larissa
 General University Hospital of Patras - Patras
 University General Hospital of Thessaloniki "AHEPA" - Thessaloniki

Ghana 
 Korle Bu Teaching Hospital, University of Ghana Medical School, Accra
 Komfo Anokye Teaching Hospital, Kwame Nkrumah University of Science and Technology College of Health Sciences, Kumasi
 Central Regional Hospital, University of Cape Coast School of Medical Sciences, Cape Coast
 Tamale Regional Teaching Hospital, University for Development Studies School of Medicine and Health Sciences, Tamale
 University Hospital, University of Cape Coast, Cape Coast
 University Hospital, Kwame Nkrumah University of Science & Technology, Kumasi
 University Hospital, University of Ghana, Legon

Hong Kong 
 Prince of Wales Hospital, Sha Tin - CUHK Faculty of Medicine
 The Duchess of Kent Children's Hospital at Sandy Bay
 Grantham Hospital
 Hong Kong Sanatorium and Hospital - Li Ka Shing Faculty of Medicine, The University of Hong Kong
 Alice Ho Miu Ling Nethersole Hospital - Li Ka Shing Faculty of Medicine, The University of Hong Kong
 Gleneagles Hong Kong Hospital - Li Ka Shing Faculty of Medicine, The University of Hong Kong
 Kowloon Hospital - CUHK Faculty of Medicine
 CUHK Medical Centre - CUHK Faculty of Medicine
 United Christian Hospital - CUHK Faculty of Medicine
 MacLehose Medical Rehabilitation Centre
 Pamela Youde Nethersole Eastern Hospital - Li Ka Shing Faculty of Medicine, The University of Hong Kong
 Prince Philip Dental Hospital
 Queen Mary Hospital, Pok Fu Lam - Li Ka Shing Faculty of Medicine, The University of Hong Kong
 Ruttonjee Hospital
 Tsan Yuk Hospital
 Tung Wah Hospital
 Tang Shiu Kin Hospital
 Tung Wah Eastern Hospital
 Queen Elizabeth Hospital

Iceland 
 Landspitali University Hospital, Reykjavík

Indonesia 
 Dr. Cipto Mangunkusumo Hospital, Jakarta
 Dharmais Hospital, Jakarta
 Harapan Kita Hospital, Jakarta
 Gatot Soebroto Army Hospital, Jakarta
 Dr. Cipto Mangunkusumo Hospital, Jakarta
 Dr. Sardjito Hospital, Yogyakarta
 Dr. Soetomo Hospital, Surabaya
 Dr. Kariadi Hospital, Semarang
 Dr. Hasan Sadikin Hospital, Bandung
 University of Indonesia Hospital, Depok

Ireland 
 Blackrock Clinic
 Connolly Hospital, Blanchardstown
 Cork University Hospital, Cork
 Mercy University Hospital, Cork
 Naas General Hospital, Naas
 Beaumont Hospital, Dublin
 Coombe Women & Infants University Hospital, Dublin
 Mater Misericordiae University Hospital, Dublin
 Royal Victoria Eye and Ear Hospital, Dublin
 St. James's Hospital, Dublin
 St. Vincent's University Hospital, Dublin
 St Patrick's University Hospital, Dublin
 University Hospital Galway, Galway
 Letterkenny University Hospital
 University Hospital Limerick, Limerick
 Roscommon University Hospital, Roscommon
 Tallaght University Hospital
 Temple Street Children's University Hospital, Dublin
 University Hospital Waterford, Waterford

Israel 
 Hadassah Medical Centers, in Ein Kerem and Mount Scopus, Jerusalem
 Shaarei Zedek Medical Center, Jerusalem
 Bikur Holim Medical Center, Jerusalem
 Soroka Hospital, Beer Sheva
 Tel Aviv Sourasky Medical Center, Tel Aviv
 Rabin Medical Center, Petah Tikva
 Sheba Medical Center, Ramat Gan
 Yitzhak Shamir Medical Center (formerly assaf harofe), Tzrifin
 Rambam Hospital, Haifa
 Bnei Zion medical Center, Haifa
 Kaplan Medical Center, Rehovot
 Ziv Medical Center, Safed
 Wolfson Medical Center, Holon

Italy

Abruzzo 
 Ospedale SS. Annunziata di Chieti - University of Chieti-Pescara, Chieti 
  Ospedale Regionale San Salvatore] University of L'Aquila, L'Aquila

Apulia 
 Azienda Ospedaliera Policlinico di Bari - University of Bari, Bari
  Azienda Ospedaliera Universitaria Ospedali Riuniti di Foggia - University of Foggia, Foggia
  Azienda ospedaliero-universitaria "Vito Fazzi"- University of Salento, Lecce
  Ospedale "Santissima Annunziata"- University of Bari, Taranto
  Ente ecclesiastico Ospedale regionale "Francesco Miulli"- LUM University, Acquaviva delle Fonti
  Azienda ospedaliera "Cardinale Giovanni Panico"- University of Bari, Tricase
  Ospedale "Perrino"- University of Bari, Brindisi

Calabria 
 Azienda Ospedaliero – Universitaria Mater Domini - University of Catanzaro, Catanzaro

Campania 
Ospedale Gaetano Fucito, Mercato San Severino - University of Salerno
Ospedale Sant’Anna e San Sebastiano, Second University of Naples and University of Naples Federico II; Caserta
Azienda Ospedaliera Universitaria Federico II - University of Naples Federico II, Naples, Italy
 I Policlinico di Napoli - Second University of Naples, Naples, Italy
A.O.R.N. Ospedale dei Colli - Second University of Naples, University of Naples Federico II; Naples, Italy
Ospedale Monaldi
CTO
Ospedale Cotugno - Second University of Naples, University of Naples Federico II; Naples, Italy
Azienda Ospedaliera Universitaria OO.RR. San Giovanni di Dio Ruggi d'Aragona - University of Salerno, Salerno
Istituto Scientifico di Riabilitazione di Telese Terme - University of Naples Federico II, Second University of Naples; Telese Terme

Emilia-Romagna 
 Azienda Ospedaliera-Universitaria Policlinico Sant'Orsola-Malpighi - University of Bologna, Bologna
The following hospitals in Bologna are not strictly “university hospitals” but home at least one university department for research and teaching:
 Istituto ortopedico Rizzoli - University of Bologna, Bologna
 Ospedale Bellaria - University of Bologna, Bologna
 Ospedale Maggiore - University of Bologna, Bologna
 Azienda Ospedaliera Universitaria di Ferrara Arcispedale Sant'Anna - University of Ferrara, Cona
 Azienda ospedaliera - Universitaria Policlinico di Modena - University of Modena and Reggio Emilia, Modena
 Nuovo Ospedale Civile S. Agostino-Estense - University of Modena and Reggio Emilia, Modena
 Azienda Ospedaliero- Universitaria di Parma - University of Parma, Parma
 Arcispedale Santa Maria Nuova - University of Modena and Reggio Emilia, University of Parma, Reggio Emilia
Ospedale "Infermi", Rimini - University of Ferrara
Ospedale ‘’Maurizio Bufalini’’, Cesena - University of Ferrara and University of Parma
Ospedale ‘’Morgagni-Pierantoni’’, Forlì - University of Ferrara
Ospedale Santa Maria delle Croci, Ravenna - University of Ferrara
Ospedale di Bentivoglio, Bentivoglio - University of Ferrara
Ospedale del Delta, Lagosanto - University of Ferrara
Ospedale di Fidenza, Fidenza - University of Ferrara and University of Parma
Villa Maria Cecilia Hospital, Cotignola - University of Ferrara and University of Pavia

Friuli-Venezia Giulia 
Azienda Sanitaria Universitaria Integrata di Trieste - University of Trieste, Trieste
Ospedale Cattinara
Ospedale Maggiore
 Azienda Ospedaliero-Universitaria Santa Maria della Misericordia - University of Udine, Udine and Cividale del Friuli
  Ospedale di Tolmezzo - University of Udine, Tolmezzo

Lazio 
 Ospedale Santa Maria Goretti - University of Rome "la Sapienza", Latina, Lazio
Agostino Gemelli University Polyclinic - Università Cattolica del Sacro Cuore, Rome
 Azienda Ospedaliera San Giovanni Addolorata - University of Rome "la Sapienza", Rome
  Policlinico Universitario Campus Bío-Medico -Universita' Campus Bío-Medico, Rome- Trigoria
 Policlinico Umberto I - University of Rome "la Sapienza", Rome
 Ospedale Sant'Andrea - University of Rome "la Sapienza", Rome
 Policlinico Tor Vergata - University of Tor Vergata, Rome
Policlinico Militare Celio - University of Rome "la Sapienza", Rome
Ospedale San Filippo Neri - University of Rome "la Sapienza", Rome
Ospedale Pediatrico Bambino Gesù - University of Rome "la Sapienza", Rome

Liguria 
 IRCCS-Azienda Ospedaliera Universitaria "San Martino" - University of Genoa, Genoa
Istituto Giannina Gaslini - University of Genoa, Genoa
Ospedale Galliera - University of Genoa, Genoa

Lombardy 
 Azienda Ospedaliera Papa Giovanni XXIII - University of Brescia, University of Milano Bicocca, Bergamo
IRCCS San Giovanni di Dio Fatebenefratelli - University of Brescia, Università Cattolica del Sacro Cuore, University of Verona, Brescia, Italy
Azienda Socio Sanitaria Territoriale degli Spedali Civili di Brescia
Spedali Civili di Brescia - University of Brescia, Brescia, Italy
Ospedale di Gardone Val Trompia, Gardone Val Trompia - University of Brescia
Ospedale di Montichiari, Montichiari - University of Brescia
Azienda Socio Sanitaria Territoriale del Garda
Ospedale di Desenzano del Garda - University of Brescia
Ospedale di Gavardo - University of Brescia
Ospedale di Leno - University of Brescia
Ospedale di Lonato del Garda - University of Brescia
Ospedale di Manerbio - University of Brescia
Ospedale di Salò - University of Brescia
Gruppo ospedaliero San Donato
 Istituto Clinico Città di Brescia - University of Brescia, Università degli Studi eCampus, University of Verona, Brescia, Italy
 Istituto Clinico Sant'Anna - University of Brescia, Università Cattolica del Sacro Cuore, University of Milan, University of Padua, University of Pavia, University of Trento, Brescia, Italy
Istituto Clinico San Rocco - University of Brescia, Vita-Salute San Raffaele University, Ome (Brescia)
Policlinico San Marco - University of Milano Bicocca, University of Milan; Osio Sotto
Policlinico San Pietro - University of Milano Bicocca and University of Milan, Ponte San Pietro
Istituto Clinico San Siro - University of Milan; Milan
Istituto Clinico Sant'Ambrogio - University of Milan and University of Insubria; Milan
IRCCS Istituto ortopedico Galeazzi - University of Milan, Milan
IRCCS Policlinico San Donato - University of Milan, San Donato Milanese
San Raffaele Hospital, Milan
 Istituti Clinici Zucchi - University of Milano Bicocca, Monza and Carate Brianza
Istituto di Cura "Città di Pavia" - University of Pavia, Pavia
Fondazione Poliambulanza - Università Cattolica del Sacro Cuore, Brescia, Italy
Ospedale Carlo Poma di Mantova - University of Brescia, University of Milan, Mantua
Azienda Ospedaliera Ospedale di Circolo di Busto Arsizio, Busto Arsizio
Ospedale di Carate Brianza, Carate Brianza - University of Milano Bicocca, University of Pavia
Ospedale Bassini - University of Milano Bicocca, Cinisello Balsamo
 Istituti Ospitalieri di Cremona - University of Brescia, Cremona
Ospedale di Desio - University of Milano Bicocca and University of Milan, Desio
Ospedale di Giussano, Giussano - University of Milano Bicocca
Ospedale Civile di Legnano, Legnano - University of Milan 
Auxologico Meda, Meda - University of Milano Bicocca
 Azienda Ospedaliera Luigi Sacco - University of Milan, Milan
 Azienda Ospedaliera San Paolo - University of Milan, Milan
European Institute of Oncology - University of Milan, Milan
Fondazione IRCCS Ca' Granda Ospedale Maggiore Policlinico - University of Milan, Milan
 IRCCS Centro Cardiologico Monzino - University of Milan, Milan
Istituto Auxologico San Luca - University of Milano Bicocca, University of Milan, University of Pavia, Milan
Istituto Ortopedico Gaetano Pini - University of Milan, Milan
 Ospedale dei Bambini Vittore Buzzi - University of Milan, University of Milano Bicocca; Milan
 Ospedale Fatebenefratelli e Oftalmico- University of Milano Bicocca, University of Milan, University of Pavia
Ospedale Niguarda Ca' Granda - University of Milan, Milan
Ospedale San Carlo Borromeo - University of Milan, Milan
Ospedale S.Giuseppe - University of Milan, Milan
 Ospedale San Luca - University of Milano Bicocca, Milan
Azienda Ospedaliera San Gerardo - University of Milano Bicocca, Monza
Policlinico di Monza - University of Milano Bicocca, University of Pavia
 IRCCS Policlinico San Matteo - University of Pavia, Pavia
Istituto Santa Margherita, Pavia
Istituto Clinico Humanitas - Humanitas University, Rozzano
Ospedale Sant'Anna - University of Insubria, San Fermo della Battaglia
Azienda Ospedaliera Bolognini, Seriate
 Ospedale Città di Sesto San Giovanni - University of Milano Bicocca, Sesto San Giovanni
Ospedale di Circolo di Varese - University of Insubria, Varese
Ospedale Filippo del Ponte - University of Insubria, Varese
Ospedale di Vimercate - University of Milan, University of Milano Bicocca, Vimercate
Fondazione Maugeri
Castel Goffredo - University of Pavia, University of Modena and Reggio Emilia 
Milano - University of Milan
Montescano - University of Pavia
Lissone - University of Milano Bicocca
Lumezzane - University of Brescia, University of Pavia 
Pavia - University of Pavia, University of Pisa, University of Genoa, University of Catania, University of Bologna 
Tradate - University of Pavia, University of Insubria

Marche 
 Azienda Ospedaliero Universitaria Ospedali Riuniti di Ancona - Marche Polytechnic University, Ancona   Official site
Umberto I 
GM Lancisi 
G Salesi

Molise 
 Ospedale Antonio Cardarelli - University of Molise, Campobasso

Piemonte 
 Clinica Salus Alessandria, Alessandria
Ospedale SS. Annunziata, University of Turin, Fossano
Azienda Ospedaliera "Maggiore della Carità" - University of Eastern Piedmont, Novara
Auxologico Piancavallo, Oggebbio - University of Eastern Piedmont, University of Turin
 Azienda Ospedaliera-Universitaria San Luigi Gonzaga - University of Turin, Orbassano
Ospedale Infermi, Rivoli
 A.O.U. Città della Salute e della Scienza di Torino - University of Turin, Turin
CTO Hospital (Turin)
Ospedale Molinette
Ospedale Infantile Regina Margherita
Ospedale Ostetrico Ginecologico S.Anna
Ospedale Amedeo di Savoia - University of Turin, Turin
Ospedale Oftalmico, University of Turin, Turin
Ospedale Sant'Andrea, Vercelli - University of Eastern Piedmont

Sardinia 
 Azienda Ospedaliera Universitaria di Cagliari - University of Cagliari, Cagliari
Ospedale Civile
Policlinico Universitario Monserrato
AO Brotzu - University of Cagliari, Cagliari
 Azienda Ospedaliera Universitaria di Sassari - University of Sassari, Sassari

Sicily 
 Azienda Ospedaliero Universitaria "Policlinico - Vittorio Emanuele" - University of Catania, Catania
P.O. Garibaldi - University of Catania, Catania
P.O. Santa Marta - University of Catania, Catania
Ospedale Santo Bambino - University of Catania, Catania
Ospedale Umberto I, Enna
 A.O.U. Policlinico “Gaetano Martino” - Messina - University of Messina, Messina
A.O. Papardo - University of Messina, Messina
Azienda Ospedaliera Universitaria Policlinico Paolo Giaccone - University of Palermo, Palermo

Tuscany 
 Azienda ospedaliero-universitaria Careggi - University of Florence, Florence
Meyer Children's Hospital - University of Florence, Florence
Ospedale San Giovanni di Dio - University of Florence, Florence
 Azienda Ospedaliero-Universitaria Pisana - University of Pisa, Pisa :
Ospedale Cisanello, Pisa
Ospedale Santa Chiara, Pisa
 Azienda Ospedaliera Universitaria Senese - Ospedale Santa Maria alle Scotte - University of Siena, Siena

Umbria 
 Azienda Ospedaliera Universitaria di Perugia, Perugia 
 Ospedale di Terni, Terni

Veneto 
 Azienda Ospedaliera di Padova - University of Padova, Padova
 Azienda Ospedaliera Universitaria Integrata Verona - University of Verona, Verona :
Policlinico G. B. Rossi, Borgo Roma, Verona 
Ospedale Civile Maggiore, Borgo Trento, Verona 
Ospedale dell’Angelo - University of Padova, Venice
Ospedale Alto Vicentino - University of Verona, Santorso
Ospedale San Bartolo, Vicenza

Japan

Hokkaido
Asahikawa Medical College Hospital w:ja:旭川医科大学附属病院
Hokkaido University Hospital w:ja:北海道大学病院
Sapporo Medical University Hospital w:ja:札幌医科大学附属病院

Tohoku
Aizu Medical Center w:ja:福島県立医科大学会津医療センター
Akita University Hospital w:ja:秋田大学医学部附属病院
Fukushima Medical University Hospital w:ja:福島県立医科大学附属病院
Hirosaki University Hospital w:ja:弘前大学医学部附属病院
Iwate Medical University Hospital w:ja:岩手医科大学附属病院
Tohoku University Hospital w:ja:東北大学病院
Yamagata University Hospital w:ja:山形大学医学部附属病院

Kantō and Shin'etsu
Juntendo University Hospital w:ja:順天堂大学医学部附属順天堂医院
Juntendo University Nerima Hospital w:ja:順天堂大学医学部附属練馬病院
Keio University Hospital w:ja:慶應義塾大学病院
Kitasato University Hospital w:ja:北里大学病院
National Defense Medical College Hospital w:ja:防衛医科大学校病院
Nihon University Itabashi Hospital w:ja:日本大学医学部附属板橋病院
St. Marianna University School of Medicine Hospital w:ja:聖マリアンナ医科大学病院
The University of Tokyo Hospital w:ja:東京大学医学部附属病院
Tokai University Hospital w:ja:東海大学医学部付属病院
Tokyo Medical And Dental University Dental Hospital w:ja:東京医科歯科大学歯学部附属病院
Tokyo Medical And Dental University Medical Hospital w:ja:東京医科歯科大学医学部附属病院
Tokyo Medical University Hospital w:ja:東京医科大学病院
University of Tsukuba Hospital w:ja:筑波大学附属病院
Yokohama City University Hospital w:ja:横浜市立大学附属病院

Tōkai and Hokuriku
Nagoya University Hospital w:ja:名古屋大学医学部附属病院
Nagoya City University Hospital w:ja:名古屋市立大学病院
Gifu University Hospital w:ja:岐阜大学医学部附属病院

Kinki
Kyoto University Hospital w:ja:京都大学医学部附属病院
Kyoto Prefectural University of Medicine Hospital w:ja:京都府立医科大学附属病院
University of Fukui Hospital w:ja:福井大学医学部附属病院
Osaka University Hospital w:ja:大阪大学医学部附属病院
Osaka University Dental Hospital w:ja:大阪大学歯学部附属病院
Osaka City University Hospital w:ja:大阪市立大学医学部附属病院
Kindai University Hospital w:ja:近畿大学医学部附属病院
Wakayama Medical University Hospital w:ja:和歌山県立医科大学附属病院

Chugoku and Shikoku
Kagawa University Hospital w:ja:香川大学医学部附属病院
Okayama University Hospital w:ja:岡山大学病院
Tokushima University Hospital w:ja:徳島大学病院

Kyūshū
Kagoshima University Hospital w:ja:鹿児島大学病院
Kumamoto University Hospital w:ja:熊本大学医学部附属病院
Kurume University Hospital w:ja:久留米大学病院
Kyūshū University Hospital w:ja:九州大学病院
Nagasaki University Hospital w:ja:長崎大学病院
Saga University Hospital w:ja:佐賀大学医学部附属病院

Jordan 
 King Abdullah University Hospital, Irbid
 University of Jordan Hospital, Amman

Kenya 
 Aga Khan University Hospital, Nairobi

Latvia 
 Riga Eastern University Hospital, Riga
 Pauls Stradins Clinical University Hospital, Riga
 Children's Clinical University Hospital, Riga

Lebanon 
 Saint Georges Hospital - University Medical Center - University of Balamand - Beirut
 American University of Beirut Medical Center (AUBMC) - Beirut
 University Medical Center-Rizk Hospital - Beirut
 Hammoud Hospital University Medical Center - Saida
 Rafik Hariri University Hospital - Jnah
 Zahraa University Hospital - Beirut
 Centre Hospitalier Universitaire Notre Dame des Secours - Byblos
 Hotel Dieu de France, Centre Hospitalier Universitaire - Beirut

Macau 
 Macau University of Science and Technology Hospital

Malaysia 
 University Malaya Medical Centre
 Universiti Kebangsaan Malaysia Medical Centre
 University of Science, Malaysia Medical Centre, Kubang Kerian, Kelantan
 International Islamic University Malaysia Medical Centre, Kuantan, Pahang
 University Putra Malaysia Teaching Hospital 
 Universiti Teknologi MARA Medical Centre, Puncak Alam, Selangor

Malta 
 Mater Dei Hospital, Msida

Mexico 
 Hospital Civil de Guadalajara, Universidad de Guadalajara
 Hospital San José Tec de Monterrey, ITESM
 Centro Médico Zambrano Hellion, Monterrey ITESM
 Hospital Universitario Dr. José Eleuterio González, Monterrey UANL
 Hospital Central "Dr. Ignacio Morones Prieto", Secretaria de Salud, San Luis Potosí, S.L.P.
 Hospital Universitario de Torreón "Dr. Joaquín del Valle Sánchez". Torreón, Coahuila - UAdeC.
 Instituto Nacional de Ciencias Médicas y Nutrición Salvador Zubirán. Ciudad de México-UNAM
 Hospital General de México Dr. Eduardo Liceaga. Ciudad de México-UNAM
 Hospital General Dr. Manuel Gea González. Ciudad de México-UNAM
 Centro Médico ABC. Ciudad de México-UNAM

Netherlands 
 Amsterdam University Medical Center (Amsterdam UMC), merger of:
 Academic Medical Center (AMC), Amsterdam (University of Amsterdam)
 VU University Medical Center (VUmc), Amsterdam (Vrije Universiteit Amsterdam))
 University Medical Center Groningen (UMCG), Groningen (University of Groningen)
 Leiden University Medical Center (LUMC), Leiden (Leiden University)
 Maastricht University Medical Center+ (MUMC+), Maastricht (Maastricht University)
 Radboud University Medical Center (Radboudumc), Nijmegen (Radboud University Nijmegen))
 Erasmus University Medical Center (Erasmus MC), Rotterdam (Erasmus University Rotterdam)
 University Medical Center Utrecht (UMCU), Utrecht (Utrecht University)

Nepal 
 Tribhuvan University Teaching Hospital, Tribhuvan University
B.P. Koirala Institute of Health Sciences

New Zealand 
 Auckland City Hospital
 Christchurch Hospital
 Dunedin Public Hospital
 Middlemore Hospital
 North Shore Hospital
 Starship Children's Health
 Waikato Hospital
 Wellington Hospital, New Zealand

Nigeria 
 Delta State University Teaching Hospital (DELSUTH), Oghara, Delta State
 Lagos University Teaching Hospital (LUTH), Idiaraba, Lagos State
 Olabisi Onabanjo University Teaching Hospital, Sagamu (OOUTH), Sagamu, Ogun State
 University College Hospital, Ibadan (UCH), Oyo State
 University Teaching Hospital, Enugu (UNTH), Enugu State
 University of Ilorin Teaching Hospital, Ilorin, (UITH), Kwara State,
 University of Maiduguri Teaching Hospital, Maiduguri, (UMTH), Borno State
 Jos University Teaching Hospital, Jos (JUTH), Plateau State
 Usmanu Danfodiyo University Teaching Hospital, Sokoto, (UDUTH), Sokoto State,
 University of Uyo Teaching Hospital Akwa-Ibom State
 Nnamdi Azikiwe University Teaching Hospital, Nnewi, Anambra
 University of Calabar Teaching Hospital (UCTH), Calabar
 Ebonyi State University Teaching Hospital
 University of Benin Teaching Hospital, Benin City
 Irrua Specialist Teaching Hospital, Irrua
 Enugu State University Teaching Hospital Parklane Enugu
 Imo State University Teaching Hospital (IMSUTH), Orlu
 Ahmadu Bello University Teaching Hospital, Shika, Zaria
 Aminu Kano Teaching Hospital, Kano
 Lagos State University Teaching Hospital (LASUTH), Ikeja, Lagos
 Ladoke Akintola University Teaching Hospital, Osogbo
 University of Port Harcourt Teaching Hospital (UPTH), Port Harcourt
 Obafemi Awolowo University Teaching Hospital, Ile-Ife

Norway 
 Akershus University Hospital, Lørenskog (University of Oslo)
 Haukeland University Hospital, Bergen (University of Bergen)
 Oslo University Hospital, Oslo (University of Oslo)
 Aker University Hospital, Oslo (University of Oslo)
 Rikshospitalet, Oslo (University of Oslo)
 Ullevål University Hospital, Oslo (University of Oslo)
 Gaustad Hospital, Oslo (University of Oslo)
 St. Olavs University Hospital, Trondheim (Norwegian University of Science and Technology)
 University Hospital of North Norway, Tromsø (University of Tromsø)
 Stavanger University Hospital, Stavanger (University of Bergen, University of Stavanger)

Pakistan 
 Ayub Teaching Hospital attached to Ayub Medical College, Abbottabad
 Aga Khan University Hospital attached to Aga Khan University, Karachi
 Baqai University Hospital, Karachi
 Dr. Ziauddin University Hospital, Karachi
 Mayo Hospital attached to the King Edward Medical College, Lahore
 Jinnah Hospital attached to Allama Iqbal Medical College, Lahore
 Military Hospiatal attached to Army Medical college
 University Dental Hospital, Lahore attached to UCD, University of Lahore
 University Teaching Hospital, Lahore attached to UCM, University of Lahore
 Combined Military Hospital attached to CMH Medical and Dental College, Lahore
 Bahawal Victoria Hospital, Bahawalpur attached to Quaid e Azam University
 Farooq Hospital attached to Akhtar Saeed Medical and Dental College

Philippines
 Angeles University Foundation Medical Center, Angeles University Foundation, Angeles, Pampanga
 Capitol University Medical City, Capitol University, Cagayan de Oro
 De La Salle Medical and Health Sciences Institute, Dasmariñas
 Fatima Medical Center, Our Lady of Fatima University, Valenzuela
 Far Eastern University – Nicanor Reyes Medical Foundation, Quezon City
 Manila Central University Hospital, Caloocan
 Manila Doctors Hospital, Manila Tytana Colleges
 Maria Reyna Xavier University Hospital, Xavier University – Ateneo de Cagayan, Cagayan de Oro
 Olivarez General Hospital, Olivarez College, Parañaque
 Philippine General Hospital, University of the Philippines Manila
 Saint Louis University Hospital of the Sacred Heart, Baguio
 St. Paul University Manila - St. Paul Hospital (formerly known as Jose P. Rizal Hospital and National Medical Research Center), Cavite
 UERMMMC, University of the East, Quezon City
 University of Santo Tomas Hospital, Manila
 Aquinas University Hospital, Legazpi city, Albay
 West Visayas State University Medical Center, Iloilo City

Portugal 
 Braga's Hospital (Hospital de Braga), Braga
 St John's University Hospital Center (Centro Hospitalar Universitário de São João), Porto
 Porto's Hospital (Centro Hospitalar Universitário do Porto), Porto
 Coimbra University Hospital Center (Centro Hospitalar Universitário de Coimbra), Coimbra
 Cova da Beira University Hospital Center(Centro Hospitalar Universitário Cova da Beira), Covilhã
 North Lisbon University Hospital Center (Centro Hospitalar Universitário de Lisboa Norte), Lisboa
 Central Lisbon University Hospital Center (Centro Hospitalar Universitário de Lisboa Central), Lisboa
 Algarve University Hospital Center (Centro Hospitalar Universitário do Algarve), Algarve

Singapore 
 National University Hospital - Yong Loo Lin School of Medicine, National University of Singapore
 Singapore General Hospital - Duke–NUS Medical School, National University of Singapore
 Tan Tock Seng Hospital - Lee Kong Chian School of Medicine, Nanyang Technological University

Spain

Andalucía

Almería
Hospital Torrecárdenas.

Cádiz
Hospital Jerez de la Frontera.
Hospital La Línea.
Hospital Puerta del Mar.
Hospital Puerto Real.

Córdoba
Hospital Universitario Reina Sofía de Córdoba.

Granada
Hospital Universitario Virgen de las Nieves.
Hospital Clínico San Cecilio.

Huelva
Hospital Juan Ramón Jimenez.

Jaén
Complejo Hospitalario de Jaén.

Málaga
Hospital Carlos Haya.
Hospital Clínico de Málaga.

Sevilla
Hospital virgen del rocio.
Hospital Virgen de Valme.
Hospital Virgen de Macarena.

Canary Islands
Hospital Universitario de Canarias
Hospital Universitario Nuestra Señora de Candelaria
Hospital Universitario Insular de Gran Canaria

Cantabria
Hospital Universitario Marqués de Valdecilla.

Catalonia

Barcelona 
 Hospital Clinic de Barcelona

Reus 

 Hospital Universitari Sant Joan de Reus

Tarragona 

 Hospital Universitari de Tarragona Joan XXIII

Community of Madrid

 Hospital Universitario Fundación Alcorcón, Alcorcón
 Hospital de La Princesa
 Hospital Infantil Universitario Niño Jesús
 University Hospital Moncloa
 Hospital Universitario Rey Juan Carlos, Móstoles
 Hospital Universitario de Móstoles, Móstoles
 HM Hospital Universitario Puerta del Sur, Móstoles
 Hospital Universitario Quironsalud Madrid, Pozuelo de Alarcón

Complutense University of Madrid

Hospital Universitario 12 de Octubre
Hospital Clínico Universitario San Carlos
Hospital General Universitario Gregorio Maranon
Hospital Universitario Ramón y Cajal
Hospital Universitario La Paz

Autonomous University of Madrid

Centro Superior de Estudios Universitarios La Salle.
Enfermería de la Comunidad de Madrid
Enfermería de la Cruz Roja
Enfermería de la Fundación Jiménez Díaz
Hospital Universitario Fundación Jiménez Díaz
Enfermería La Paz
Enfermería Puerta de Hierro
Hospital Universitario Puerta de Hierro, Majadahonda
Fisioterapia de la ONCE

Murcia

Hospital Universitario Santa María del Rosell.
Hospital Universitario Virgen de la Arrixaca.
Hospital General Universitario Reina Sofía de Murcia.
Hospital Morales Meseguer.

Navarre
Clínica Universidad de Navarra, Facultad de Medicina.

Valencian Community

Alicante
 Hospital Universitario San Juan De Alicante

Castellón de la Plana
 Hospital General Universitari de Castellón (Castellon General University Hospital)
.

Sant Joan d'Alacant 
 Hospital Universitario San Juan De Alicante

Valencia 
 Consorci Hospital General Universitari de València
 Hospital Universitari i Politècnic La Fe

Somalia 
 Bardera Polytechnic, Bardera
 Edna Maternity Hospital, Hargeisa

South Africa 
 Groote Schuur Hospital, Cape Town
 Pretoria Academic Hospital, Pretoria (renamed Steve Biko Hospital in 2008)
 Tygerberg Hospital, Bellville
 Charlotte Maxeke Johannesburg Academic Hospital, Johannesburg
 Universitas Hospital, Bloemfontein
 King Edward VIII Hospital, Durban
 Dr George Mukhari Hospital, Ga-Rankuwa
 Nelson Mandela Academic Hospital, Mthatha
 Mankweng Polokwane Hospital complex, Mthatha

South Korea

Seoul 
 Seoul National University Hospital, Seoul National University
 Sinchon Yonsei Severance Hospital, Yonsei University
 Gangnam Yonsei Severance Hospital, Yonsei University
 Samsung Medical Center, Sungkyunkwan University
 Asan Medical Center, Ulsan University
 Seoul St. Mary's Hospital, Catholic University of Korea
 Yeouido St. Mary's Hospital, Catholic University of Korea
Gangnam CHA Medical Center, CHA University
 St. Paul's Hospital, Catholic University of Korea
 Konkuk University Hospital, Konkuk University
 Hanyang University Hospital, Hanyang University
 Ewha Womans University Hospital, Ewha Womans University
 Soonchunhyang University Seoul Hospital, Soonchunhyang University
 Eulji Medical Center, Eulji University
 Seoul Paik's Hospital, Inje University
 Sanggye Paik's Hospital, Inje University
 Korea University Anam Hospital, Korea University
 Korea University Guro Hospital, Korea University
 Hangang Seongsim Hospital, Hallym University
 Seoul Seongsim Hospital, Hallym University
 Gangdong Seongsim Hospital, Hallym University
 Kyung Hee Medical Center, Kyung Hee University
 Gangdong Kyung Hee Medical Center, Kyung Hee University

Busan 
 Pusan National University Hospital, Pusan National University
 Dong-a University Hospital, Dong-a University
 Gospel Hospital, Kosin University
 Dong-eui Medical Center, Dong-eui University
 Busan Paik's Hospital, Inje University
 Haeundae Paik's Hospital, Inje University

Daegu 
 Kyungpook National University Hospital, Kyungpook National University
 Chilgok Kyungpook National University Hospital, Kyungpook National University
 Yeungnam University Hospital, Yeungnam University
 Catholic University of Daegu Hospital, Catholic University of Daegu
 Dongsan Medical Center, Keimyung University
Daegu CHA Woman Hospital, CHA University

Incheon 
 Incheon St. Mary's Hospital, Catholic University of Korea
 Inha University Hospital, Inha University, 
 Gil Medical Center, Gachon University
 International St. Mary's Hospital, Catholic Kwandong University

Gwangju 
 Chonnam National University Hospital, Chonnam National University
 Chosun University Hospital, Chosun University

Daejeon 
 Chungnam National University Hospital, Chungnam National University
 Eulji University Hospital, Eulji University
 Daejeon St. Mary's Hospital, Catholic University of Korea
 Konyang University Hospital, Konyang University

Ulsan 
 Ulsan University Hospital, Ulsan University

Gyeonggi Province 
 Ajou University Hospital, Ajou University, Suwon
 St. Vincent Hospital, Catholic University of Korea, Suwon
 Ilsan Paik's Hospital, Inje University, Goyang
 Dongguk University Ilsan Hospital, Goyang
Bundang CHA Medical Center, CHA University, Seongnam
Bundang CHA Woman Hospital, CHA University, Seongnam
Ilsan CHA Medical Center, CHA University, Ilsan
 Bundang Seoul University Hospital, Seoul National University, Seongnam
 Yongin Yonsei Severance Hospital, Yonsei University, Yongin
 Bucheon St. Mary's Hospital, Catholic University of Korea, Bucheon
 Soonchunhyang University Bucheon Hospital, Soonchunhyang University, Bucheon
 Korea University Ansan Hospital, Ansan
 Seongsim Hospital, Hallym University, Anyang
 Dongtan Seongsim Hospital, Hallym University, Hwaseong
 Guri Hanyang University Hospital, Hanyang University, Guri
 Uijeongbu St. Mary's Hospital, Catholic University of Korea, Uijeongbu

Gangwon Province 
 Chuncheon Sungsim Hospital, Hallym University, Chuncheon
 Kangwon National University Hospital, Kangwon National University, Chuncheon
 Gangneung Asan Hospital, Ulsan University, Gangneung
 Wonju Severance Christian Hospital, Yonsei University, Wonju

Chungcheong Province 
 Dankook University Hospital, Dankook University, Cheonan
 Soonchunhyang University Hospital, Soonchunhyang University. Cheonan
 Chungbuk National University Hospital, Chungbuk National University, Cheongju
 Konkuk University Chungju Hospital, Konkuk University, Chungju

Jeolla Province 
 Jeonbuk National University Hospital, Jeonbuk National University, Jeonju
 Wonkwang University Hospital, Wonkwang University, Iksan
 Hwasun Chonnam National University Hospital, Chonnam National University, Hwasun County

Gyeongsang Province 
 Yangsan Pusan National University Hospital, Pusan National University
 Gyeongsang National University Hospital, Gyeongsang National University, Jinju
 Changwon Gyeongsang National University, Gyeongsang National University, Changwon
 Changwon Samsung Hospital, Sungkyunkwan University, Changwon
 Gumi CHA Medical Center, Cha University, Gumi
 Dongguk University Gyeongju Hospital, Dongguk University, Gyeongju
 Yeongcheon Yeungnam University Hospital, Yeungnam University, Yeongcheon

Jeju Province 
 Jeju National University Hospital, Jeju National University, Jeju

Sri Lanka 
Karapitiya Teaching Hospital
Lady Ridgeway Hospital for Children
Teaching Hospital, Peradeniya
Jaffna Teaching Hospital
Batticaloa Teaching Hospital

Sweden 
Karolinska University Hospital, Huddinge and Solna
Rosenlund Hospital, Stockholm (Karolinska Institute)
St. Eriks Eye Hospital, Stockholm (Karolinska Institute)
Uppsala University Hospital, Uppsala
Norrland's University Hospital, Umeå
Sahlgrenska University Hospital, Gothenburg
Örebro University Hospital, Örebro
Skåne University Hospital, Malmö and Lund
Orupssjukhuset, Höör
Linköping University Hospital, Linköping
Danderyds sjukhus, Stockholm 
Hallands sjukhus, Halmstad (Lund University, University of Copenhagen)
Vrinnevisjukhuset, Norrköping (Linköping University)
Helsingborgs lasarett, Helsingborg (Lund University)

Switzerland

There are six university hospitals in Switzerland:
 University Hospital of Basel (USB), Basel
 University Hospital of Bern (Inselspital), Bern
 University Hospital of Geneva (HUG), Geneva
 University Hospital of Lausanne (CHUV), Lausanne
Kantonsspital, Lucerne
University Children's Hospital, Zürich
 University Hospital of Zurich (USZ), Zurich
Balgrist University Hospital, Zurich

Syria

Damascus University
Damascus university runs eight hospitals in the city of Damascus:

Al Assad University Hospital
Al Mouwasat University Hospital
Obstetrics & Gynecology University Hospital
Cardiac Surgery University Hospital
Dermatology & Venereal Diseases University Hospital
Children's University Hospital
Al Bairouni University Hospital
Oral Maxillofacial Surgery Hospital

Aleppo University
Currently, the university runs 5 hospitals in the city of Aleppo:
 Aleppo University Hospital (AUH)
 Aleppo University Cardiovascular Surgical Centre
 OB/GYN Hospital named after Basil al-
Assad
 Al-Kindi Hospital
 Oral and Maxillofacial Surgical Centre

Tishreen University- Lattakia
Tishreen university hospital-Lattakia
Chemotherapy &Radiotherapy centre -Lattakia

Taiwan

Taipei 
 National Taiwan University Hospital - National Taiwan University

Hualien 
 Buddhist Tzu Chi General Hospital - Tzu Chi University

Thailand

Bangkok 
 Chulabhon Hospital  - HRH Princess Chulabhorn College of Medical Science
 King Chulalongkorn Memorial Hospital  - Chulalongkorn University (Affiliated with Thai Red Cross Society)
 Phramongkutklao Hospital  - Phramongkutklao College of Medicine
 Ramathibodi Hospital  - Faculty of Medicine Ramathibodi Hospital, Mahidol University
 Siriraj Hospital  - Faculty of Medicine Siriraj Hospital, Mahidol University
 Hospital for Tropical Diseases - Faculty of Tropical Medicine, Mahidol University
 Vajira Hospital  - Faculty of Medicine Vajira Hospital, Navamindradhiraj University

Chiang Mai 
 Chiang Mai University Hospital  - Chiang Mai University

Chiang Rai 
 Mae Fah Luang University Hospital - Mae Fah Luang University

Chon Buri 
 Burapha University Hospital - Burapha University

Khon Kaen 
 Srinagarindra Hospital  - Khon Kaen University

Mahasarakham 
 Suddhavej Hospital - Mahasarakham University

Nakhon Nayok 
 HRH Princess Maha Chakri Sirindhorn Medical Center  - Srinakharinwirot University

Nakhon Pathom 
 Golden Jubilee Medical Center - Faculty of Medicine Siriraj Hospital, Mahidol University

Nakhon Ratchasima 
Suranaree University of Technology Hospital  - Suranaree University of Technology

Nakhon Srithammarat 
Walailak University Hospital Center  - Walailak University

Narathiwat 
Galyanivadhanakarun Hospital - Princess of Naradhiwas University

Nonthaburi 
Panyananthaphikkhu Chonprathan Medical Center - Srinakharinwirot University

Pathum Thani 
Thammasat University Hospital  - Thammasat University

Phitsanulok 
 Naresuan University Hospital  - Naresuan University

Samut Prakan 
 Chakri Naruebodindra Medical Institute - Faculty of Medicine Ramathibodi Hospital, Mahidol University

Songkhla 
 Songklanagarind Hospital  - Prince of Songkla University

Tunisia

Tunis 
 University Hospital La Rabta, Tunis - Tunis El Manar University, Medicine School of Tunis
 University Hospital Charles-Nicolle, Tunis - Tunis El Manar University, Medicine School of Tunis
 Military University Hospital, Tunis - Tunis El Manar University, Medicine School of Tunis
 University Hospital Mongi-Slim of La Marsa, Tunis - Tunis El Manar University, Medicine School of Tunis
 University Hospital Habib-Thameur of Montfleury, Tunis - Tunis El Manar University, Medicine School of Tunis

Nabeul 
 University Hospital Taher-Maamouri, Nabeul - Tunis El Manar University, Medicine School of Tunis

Bizerte 
 University Hospital of Bizerte, Bizerte - Tunis El Manar University, Medicine School of Tunis

Sousse 
 University Hospital Sahloul, Sousse - University of Sousse, Faculty of Medecine Ibn El Jazzar of Sousse
 University Hospital Farhat-Hached, Sousse - University of Sousse, Faculty of Medecine Ibn El Jazzar of Sousse

Monastir 
 University Hospital Fattouma-Bourguiba, Monastir - University of Monastir, Faculty of Medecine of Monastir
 Clinical University Hospital of dentistry, Monastir - University of Monastir, Faculty of Dental Medicine of Monastir

Mahdia 
 University Hospital Tahar-Sfar, Mahdia - University of Monastir, Faculty of Medecine of Monastir

Sfax 
 University Hospital Hédi-Chaker, Sfax - University of Sfax, Faculty of Medecine of Sfax
 University Hospital Habib-Bourguiba, Sfax - University of Sfax, Faculty of Medecine of Sfax

United Kingdom

Aberdeen 

NHS Grampian : 
Aberdeen Royal Infirmary - University of Aberdeen
Aberdeen Maternity Hospital - University of Aberdeen
Royal Aberdeen Children's Hospital - University of Aberdeen
Woodend Hospital - University of Aberdeen
Royal Cornhill Hospital - University of Aberdeen

Aberystwyth 
 Bronglais Hospital - Swansea University Medical School

Airdrie
 Monklands Hospital - University of Glasgow

Ayr 
 University Hospital Ayr - University of Glasgow

Bebington, Wirral 
 Clatterbridge Hospital - University of Liverpool

Belfast 
 Belfast City Hospital
 Mater Infirmorum Hospital
 Royal Victoria Hospital

Birmingham 
Heart of England NHS Foundation Trust :
Good Hope Hospital - University of Birmingham Medical School, University of Birmingham
Heartlands Hospital
 Midland Metropolitan University Hospital
 Queen Elizabeth Hospital Birmingham
 Solihull Hospital
 University Hospital Birmingham - University of Birmingham Medical School, University of Birmingham
City Hospital, Birmingham

Blackpool
 Blackpool Victoria Hospital

Bradford
 Bradford Royal Infirmary - Leeds School of Medicine, University of Leeds, University of Bradford
 St Luke's Hospital, Bradford - Leeds School of Medicine, University of Leeds, University of Bradford

Brighton 
 Royal Sussex County Hospital - Brighton and Sussex Medical School, University of Sussex, University of Brighton

Bristol 
 Frenchay Hospital - Bristol Medical School, University of Bristol
 Southmead Hospital - Bristol Medical School, University of Bristol
 Bristol Royal Hospital for Children - Bristol Medical School, University of Bristol
 Bristol Royal Infirmary - Bristol Medical School, University of Bristol

Cambridge 
 Cambridge University Hospitals NHS Foundation Trust
 Addenbrooke's Hospital
 Rosie Hospital
 Saffron Walden Community Hospital

Cardiff 
 University Hospital of Wales - Cardiff University School of Medicine, Cardiff University
 Noah's Ark Children's Hospital for Wales - Cardiff University School of Medicine, Cardiff University
 University Dental Hospital, Cardiff - Cardiff University School of Medicine, Cardiff University
 University Hospital Llandough - Cardiff University School of Medicine, Cardiff University

Chelmsford 
 Broomfield Hospital

Chertsey 
 St Peter's Hospital (Imperial College London; St George's, University of London)

Clydebank 
 Golden Jubilee University National Hospital

Coventry 
 University Hospital Coventry - Warwick Medical School, University of Warwick

Craigavon, Northern Ireland 
 Craigavon Area Hospital

Carlisle
 Cumberland Infirmary - Newcastle University Medical School, Newcastle University
 West Cumberland Hospital - Newcastle University Medical School, Newcastle University

Derby, England 
 Royal Derby Hospital

Derry, Northern Ireland 
 Altnagelvin Area Hospital

Dumfries 
 Dumfries and Galloway Royal Infirmary - University of Glasgow, University of the West of Scotland (UWS)

Dundonald, Northern Ireland 
 Ulster Hospital

Durham 
 University Hospital of North Durham - Newcastle University, Durham University

Dundee 
 Ninewells Hospital - University of Dundee
 Tayside Children's Hospital

East Kilbride 
 Hairmyres Hospital - University of Glasgow, University of the West of Scotland, Glasgow Caledonian University

Edinburgh 
 Lauriston Building
 Royal Infirmary of Edinburgh - University of Edinburgh Medical School, University of Edinburgh
 Western General Hospital - University of Edinburgh Medical School, University of Edinburgh
 Royal Hospital for Sick Children - University of Edinburgh Medical School, University of Edinburgh
 St John's Hospital, Livingston - University of Edinburgh Medical School, University of Edinburgh

Elgin 
 Dr Gray's Hospital

Enniskillen, Northern Ireland 
 South West Acute Hospital

Exeter 
 Royal Devon and Exeter Hospital - Peninsula Medical School, University of Exeter, University of Plymouth

Falkirk 
 Falkirk & District Royal Infirmary - University of Glasgow

Gateshead 
 Queen Elizabeth Hospital - Newcastle University Medical School, Newcastle University

Glasgow 
 Glasgow Dental Hospital and School
 Glasgow Royal Infirmary - University of Glasgow
 Gartnavel General Hospital - University of Glasgow
 Gartnavel Royal Hospital - University of Glasgow
 Leverndale Hospital - University of Glasgow
 New Victoria Hospital - University of Glasgow
 Parkhead Hospital - University of Glasgow
 Princess Royal Maternity Hospital - University of Glasgow
 Queen Elizabeth University Hospital - University of Glasgow
 Royal Hospital for Children - University of Glasgow
 Stobhill Hospital - University of Glasgow
 Victoria Integrated Care Centre, Helensburgh - University of Glasgow
 Southern General Hospital - University of Glasgow
 Western Infirmary - University of Glasgow

Great Yarmouth 
 James Paget University Hospital - University of East Anglia Medical School, University of East Anglia

Greenock 
 Inverclyde Royal Hospital - University of Glasgow

Govan, Scotland 
 Queen Elizabeth University Hospital

Hartlepool 
 University Hospital of Hartlepool

Haywards Heath
 Princess Royal Hospital

Kilmarnock
 Crosshouse Hospital - University of Glasgow, University of the West of Scotland (UWS)

Kingston upon Hull 
 Hull Royal Infirmary - Hull York Medical School, University of Hull
 Castle Hill Hospital - Hull York Medical School, University of Hull

Inverness, Scotland 
 Raigmore Hospital - University of Aberdeen

Irvine 
 Ayrshire Central Hospital - University of Glasgow

Lancaster, England 
 Royal Lancaster Infirmary

Leeds 
 St James's University Hospital, Leeds - University of Leeds
 Leeds General Infirmary - University of Leeds

Leicester 
 Leicester Royal Infirmary - Leicester Medical School, University of Leicester
 Leicester General Hospital - Leicester Medical School, University of Leicester
 Glenfield Hospital - Leicester Medical School, University of Leicester

Liverpool 
 Aintree University Hospitals NHS Foundation Trust:
Aintree University Hospital
The Walton Centre for Neurology and Neurosurgery
Alder Hey Children's NHS Foundation Trust: 
Alder Hey Children's Hospital, University of Liverpool
 Liverpool Heart and Chest Hospital NHS Foundation Trust:
Liverpool Heart and Chest Hospital, University of Liverpool
 Liverpool Women's NHS Foundation Trust :
Liverpool Women's Hospital, University of Liverpool
 Royal Liverpool University Hospital, University of Liverpool
 Broadgreen Hospital, University of Liverpool
 St Helens & Knowsley Teaching Hospitals NHS Trust, University of Liverpool :
Whiston Hospital
St Helens Hospital
 Wirral University Teaching Hospital NHS Foundation Trust, University of Liverpool

Livingston, Scotland 
 St John's Hospital, Livingston

London 
Barking, Havering and Redbridge University Hospitals NHS Trust :
Queen's Hospital
King George Hospital
Barts Health NHS Trust :
Royal London Hospital - Barts and The London School of Medicine and Dentistry, University of London
St Bartholomew's Hospital - Barts and The London School of Medicine and Dentistry, University of London
Newham University Hospital - Barts and The London School of Medicine and Dentistry, University of London
Whipps Cross University Hospital - Barts and The London School of Medicine and Dentistry, University of London
Central Middlesex Hospital - Imperial College School of Medicine
Imperial College Healthcare NHS Trust :
Charing Cross Hospital - Imperial College School of Medicine, University of London
Hammersmith Hospital - Imperial College School of Medicine
Queen Charlotte's and Chelsea Hospital
St Mary's Hospital, London - Imperial College School of Medicine, University of London
Chelsea and Westminster Hospital NHS Foundation Trust :
Chelsea and Westminster Hospital - Imperial College School of Medicine, University of London
West Middlesex University Hospital - Imperial College School of Medicine, University of London
University College London Hospitals NHS Foundation Trust
Eastman Dental Hospital - UCL Medical School
Hospital for Tropical Diseases
National Hospital for Neurology and Neurosurgery
Royal London Hospital for Integrated Medicine
Royal National Throat, Nose and Ear Hospital - UCL Medical School
University College Hospital - UCL Medical School, University of London; UCL Partners
University College Hospital at Westmoreland Street - UCL Medical School
UCH Macmillan Cancer Centre - UCL Medical School
University College Hospital at Westmoreland Street - UCL Medical School
Great Ormond Street Hospital for Children NHS Foundation Trust : 
Great Ormond Street Hospital - UCL Medical School, University of London; UCL Partners
Guy's and St Thomas' NHS Foundation Trust :
Guy's Hospital - King's College London, University of London
King's College Hospital - King's College London, University of London
St Thomas' Hospital - King's College London, University of London
Homerton University Hospital NHS Foundation Trust :
Homerton University Hospital
Croydon Health Services NHS Trust :
Croydon University Hospital - University of London
Moorfields Eye Hospital NHS Foundation Trust :
Moorfields Eye Hospital - University of London
 Queen Mary's Hospital, Sidcup - University of London
 Royal Free Hospital - UCL Medical School, University of London; UCL Partners
London North West Healthcare NHS Trust :
St Mark's Hospital - UCL Medical School
Northwick Park Hospital
Central Middlesex Hospital
Ealing Hospital
St George's Hospital - St. George's, University of London
 University Hospital Lewisham - King's College London, University of London
 Whittington Hospital - UCL Medical School, University of London

Luton 
 Luton and Dunstable University Hospital NHS Foundation Trust :
 Luton and Dunstable University Hospital - UCL Medical School

Manchester 
Central Manchester University Hospitals NHS Foundation Trust
Manchester Royal Eye Hospital
Manchester Royal Infirmary - University of Manchester
Royal Manchester Children's Hospital
Saint Mary's Hospital, Manchester
University Dental Hospital of Manchester
Trafford General Hospital
 North Manchester General Hospital - University of Manchester
 University Hospital of South Manchester - University of Manchester

Middlesbrough 
 James Cook University Hospital

Milton Keynes
 Milton Keynes University HospitalUniversity of Buckingham

Newcastle upon Tyne 
 Royal Victoria Infirmary - Newcastle University Medical School, Newcastle University
 Freeman Hospital-Newcastle University Medical School, Newcastle University
 Great North Children's Hospital, Newcastle University
 St Nicholas Hospital, Newcastle upon Tyne

Newry, Northern Ireland 
 Daisy Hill Hospital

Norwich 
 Norfolk and Norwich University Hospital - University of East Anglia Medical School, University of East Anglia

Northamptonshire 
Northampton General Hospital - University of Northampton, University of Leicester
Kettering General Hospital - University of Northampton, University of Leicester

Northumberland 
 Wansbeck General Hospital - Newcastle University Medical School, Newcastle University

Nottingham 
 Queen's Medical Centre - University of Nottingham
 Nottingham City Hospital - University of Nottingham

Oxford 
 John Radcliffe Hospital - Oxford University
 Churchill Hospital - Oxford University
 Warneford Hospital - Oxford University

Paisley 
 Dykebar Hospital - University of Glasgow
 Royal Alexandra Hospital - University of Glasgow

Plymouth 
 Derriford Hospital - Peninsula Medical School, University of Plymouth

Portsmouth 
 Portsmouth Hospitals University NHS Trust
Queen Alexandra Hospital - University of Portsmouth
Gosport War Memorial Hospital
Fareham Community Hospital
St. Mary's Community Health Campus
Petersfield Hospital
Oak Park Community Clinic

Redhill
 East Surrey Hospital - Brighton and Sussex Medical School

Salford
 Salford Royal NHS Foundation Trust

Sandwell 
 Sandwell General Hospital

Sheffield 
 Royal Hallamshire Hospital - University of Sheffield, Sheffield Hallam University
 Northern General Hospital - University of Sheffield, Sheffield Hallam University
 Sheffield Children's Hospital - University of Sheffield, Sheffield Hallam University

Shrewsbury 
 Royal Shrewsbury Hospital

Southampton 
University Hospital Southampton NHS Foundation Trust : 
Southampton General Hospital - Southampton Medical School, University of Southampton
Princess Anne Hospital
Royal South Hants Hospital

South Shields 
 South Tyneside District Hospital - Newcastle University Medical School, Newcastle University

Stirling 
 Stirling Royal Infirmary - University of Glasgow

Steeton with Eastburn
 Airedale General Hospital - Leeds School of Medicine

Stockton-on-Tees
 University Hospital of North Tees

Stoke-on-Trent 
 Royal Stoke University Hospital - Keele University Medical School, Keele University

Swansea 
 Morriston Hospital - Swansea University School of Medicine, Swansea University
 Singleton Hospital - Swansea University School of Medicine, Swansea University

Tees Valley 
 Darlington Memorial Hospital - Newcastle University Medical School, Durham University, Newcastle University
 James Cook University Hospital - University of Teesside, Newcastle University Medical School, Durham University, Newcastle University
 University Hospital of Hartlepool - Newcastle University Medical School, Newcastle University
 University Hospital of North Tees- Newcastle University Medical School, Newcastle University

Telford 
 Princess Royal Hospital, Telford

Truro 
 Royal Cornwall Hospital - Peninsula Medical School, University of Exeter, University of Plymouth

Upton, Merseyside 
 Wirral Women and Children's Hospital

Wishaw 
 University Hospital Wishaw - University of Glasgow, University of the West of Scotland (UWS), Glasgow Caledonian University (GCU)

Worksop 
 Bassetlaw District General Hospital - University of Sheffield

Wrexham 
North Wales Regional Hospital - Wrexham Medical Institute, Glyndwr University

York 
 York Hospital - University of York

United States

Alaska

Anchorage 
 Providence Alaska Medical Center

Alabama 
 Marshall Medical Center South, Boaz, Alabama
 South Baldwin Regional Medical Center, Foley, Alabama
UAB Health Center - Selma

Birmingham 
 University of Alabama Hospitals (UAB) - University of Alabama School of Medicine 
 Kirklin Clinic - University of Alabama School of Medicine
  UAB Callahan Eye Hospital - University of Alabama School of Medicine
 Children's Hospital of Alabama - University of Alabama School of Medicine
UAB Highlands
St. Vincent's East, Birmingham
Brookwood Baptist Health System, Birmingham, Alabama
Princeton Baptist Medical Center

Dothan
 Southeast Alabama Medical Center

Huntsville
 Huntsville Hospital System - University of Alabama School of Medicine

Mobile 
  University of South Alabama Medical Center - University of South Alabama College of Medicine 
University of South Alabama Children's and Women's Hospital
 Mobile Infirmary - University of South Alabama - University of South Alabama College of Medicine

Montgomery 
 UAB Health Center - Montgomery - University of Alabama School of Medicine
Baptist Medical Center South

Phenix City
 Jack Hughston Memorial Hospital

Tuscaloosa
 UAB Health Center - Tuscaloosa - University of Alabama School of Medicine

Arizona 
 North Country HealthCare, Flagstaff, Arizona
 Honor Health, Scottsdale, Arizona
 Yuma Regional Medical Center

Phoenix 
 Banner - University Medical Center Phoenix - University of Arizona College of Medicine – Phoenix
 Valleywise Health - University of Arizona College of Medicine & Mayo Medical School
Arizona Burn Center
Dignity Health St. Joseph's Hospital and Medical Center - University of Arizona College of Medicine & Creighton University School of Medicine
Mayo Clinic
Phoenix Children's Hospital

Tucson 
Banner - University Medical Center Tucson - University of Arizona College of Medicine - Tucson
Banner - University Medical Center South - University of Arizona College of Medicine - Tucson

Arkansas 
 White River Health System, Batesville, Arkansas
 Unity Health-White County Medical Center, Searcy, Arkansas
 Baptist Health, North Little Rock, Arkansas
Veterans Health Care System of the Ozarks

Fayetteville 
 Washington Regional Medical Center - UAMS College of Medicine

Little Rock 
 Arkansas Children's Hospital - UAMS College of Medicine
 Central Arkansas Veterans Health Care System - UAMS College of Medicine
 University of Arkansas for Medical Sciences/UAMS Medical Center - UAMS College of Medicine

California 
 Kaiser Permanente
 Fontana Medical Center, Fontana, California
 Ontario, California
VA Palo Alto Health Care System

Bakersfield 
 Kern Medical Center - David Geffen School of Medicine at UCLA

Beverly Hills, California 
 Keck Medical Center of USC Beverly Hills - Keck School of Medicine of USC

Colton, California 
 Arrowhead Regional Medical Center - Loma Linda University School of Medicine, UC Irvine School of Medicine, California State University, San Bernardino, Crafton Hills College, Western University of Health Sciences, Touro University California

Downey, California 
 Downey Regional Medical Center - Western University of Health Sciences
Rancho Los Amigos National Rehabilitation Center

Duarte
 City of Hope National Medical Center

Fairfield
 David Grant USAF Medical Center

French Camp
 San Joaquin General Hospital

Fresno
 Community Regional Medical Center - UC San Francisco School of Medicine

Glendale 
 USC Verdugo Hills Hospital - Keck School of Medicine of USC
Glendale Adventist Medical Center

Inglewood
 Centinela Hospital Medical Center

La Cañada Flintridge
 Keck Medicine - La Cañada Flintridge - Keck School of Medicine of USC

Loma Linda 
 Loma Linda University Medical Center

Long Beach 
 College Medical Center - Western University of Health Sciences & Touro University California
Long Beach Memorial Medical Center

Los Angeles 
 Cedars-Sinai Medical Center - Keck School of Medicine of USC & David Geffen School of Medicine at UCLA
 Children's Hospital Los Angeles - Keck School of Medicine of USC
Good Samaritan Hospital (Los Angeles)
Hollywood Presbyterian Medical Center - CHA University
Kaiser Permanente Southern California - Los Angeles Medical Center
 Keck Hospital of USC, Los Angeles - Keck School of Medicine of USC
 Keck Medicine, Downtown Los Angeles - Keck School of Medicine of USC
 Los Angeles County-USC Medical Center - Keck School of Medicine of USC
Martin Luther King Jr. Community Hospital - UCLA School of Medicine 
Olive View-UCLA Medical Center – Sylmar
 Resnick Neuropsychiatric Hospital at UCLA - UCLA School of Medicine
 Ronald Reagan UCLA Medical Center - UCLA School of Medicine
USC Norris Comprehensive Cancer Center and Hospital - Keck School of Medicine of USC
White Memorial Medical Center

Moreno Valley 
 Riverside County Regional Medical Center - UC Riverside School of Medicine, Loma Linda University School of Medicine & Western University of Health Sciences

Murrieta
 Loma Linda University Medical Center – Murrieta – Murrieta

Oakland
Children's Hospital Oakland - UC San Francisco School of Medicine
Highland Hospital - UC San Francisco School of Medicine

Orange 
 UCI Medical Center - UC Irvine School of Medicine
Children's Hospital of Orange County

Palm Springs
 Desert Regional Medical Center

Palo Alto 
 Lucile Packard Children's Hospital - Stanford University School of Medicine
 Stanford University Medical Center - Stanford University School of Medicine
 VA Palo Alto Health Care System  - Stanford Medical School

Pasadena 
Keck Medicine - Pasadena - Keck School of Medicine of USC
Huntington Hospital

Pomona 
 Pomona Valley Hospital Medical Center - Keck School of Medicine of USC & Western University of Health Sciences

Riverside
 Riverside County Regional Medical Center

Sacramento
 UC Davis Medical Center - UC Davis School of Medicine

Salinas 
 Natividad Medical Center - UC San Francisco School of Medicine

San Diego 
 UC San Diego Medical Center, Hillcrest - UC San Diego School of Medicine
 Jacobs Medical Center - UC San Diego School of Medicine
Naval Medical Center San Diego
Moores Cancer Center
Kaiser Permanente, San Diego Medical Center

San Francisco 
 San Francisco General Hospital (UCSF) - UC San Francisco School of Medicine
 UCSF Medical Center - UC San Francisco School of Medicine
 UCSF Medical Center at Mission Bay, (Mission Bay neighborhood) - UC San Francisco School of Medicine
UCSF Mount Zion Medical Center
California Pacific Medical Center
San Francisco VA Medical Center
Langley Porter Psychiatric Institute
University of California, San Francisco Fetal Treatment Center

San Jose 
 Santa Clara Valley Medical Center - Stanford Medical School

Santa Barbara
 Santa Barbara Cottage Hospital

Santa Monica
 UCLA Medical Center, Santa Monica - UCLA Medical School

Torrance
 Harbor–UCLA Medical Center

Ventura
 Community Memorial Hospital of San Buenaventura
 Ventura County Medical Center

Visalia
 Kaweah Delta Medical Center - UC Irvine School of Medicine

Willowbrook 
 Martin Luther King Jr. Community Hospital

Colorado

Aurora 
 University of Colorado Hospital- University of Colorado School of Medicine
Children's Hospital Colorado

Broomfield

 UCHealth Broomfield Hospital

Colorado Springs

 UCHealth Grandview Hospital

Denver

Denver Health Medical Center - University of Colorado School of Medicine
National Jewish Health - University of Colorado School of Medicine
Denver Veteran’s Affairs Medical Center - University of Colorado School of Medicine
Rose Medical Center
St. Joseph Hospital

Pueblo 

 Parkview Medical Center

Connecticut

Bridgeport 
 St. Vincent's Medical Center - Frank H. Netter M.D. School of Medicine at Quinnipiac University

Danbury 
 Danbury Hospital (Yale University School of Medicine, New York Medical College, Ross University School of Medicine, University of Vermont College of Medicine), American University of the Caribbean

Derby 
 Griffin Hospital - Frank H. Netter M.D. School of Medicine at Quinnipiac University; Yale University School of Medicine

Fairfield 
 Jewish Senior Services, The Jewish Home - Frank H. Netter M.D. School of Medicine at Quinnipiac University

Farmington 
 UConn Health Center - University of Connecticut School of Medicine

Greenwich

 Greenwich Hospital (Yale University School of Medicine; New York Medical College)

Hartford

 Connecticut Children's Medical Center - Frank H. Netter M.D. School of Medicine at Quinnipiac University
 Hartford Hospital - University of Connecticut School of Medicine
 St. Francis Hospital - University of Connecticut School of Medicine

Meriden 
 MidState Medical Center - Frank H. Netter M.D. School of Medicine at Quinnipiac University

Middletown 
 Middlesex Hospital Connecticut - Frank H. Netter M.D. School of Medicine at Quinnipiac University

New London

 Lawrence+Memorial Hospital (Yale-New Haven Health System)

New Haven

 Yale-New Haven Hospital - Yale School of Medicine
Hospital of Saint Raphael - Yale School of Medicine

Norwalk 
 Norwalk Hospital - Yale University School of Medicine, New York Medical College

Wallingford 
 Gaylord Specialty Healthcare- Frank H. Netter M.D. School of Medicine at Quinnipiac University
 Masonicare - Frank H. Netter M.D. School of Medicine at Quinnipiac University
 Waterbury Hospital - Frank H. Netter M.D. School of Medicine at Quinnipiac University

Putnam

 Day Kimball Hospital

Stamford

 Stamford Hospital

Waterbury

 St. Mary's Hospital - Yale University School of Medicine
Waterbury Hospital Health Center

District of Columbia (Washington, D.C.) 

 The George Washington University Hospital
 Howard University Hospital
 MedStar Georgetown University Hospital
 MedStar Washington Hospital Center
 St. Elizabeths Hospital
 Sibley Memorial Hospital
Children's National Medical Center
Providence Hospital (Washington, D.C.)

Delaware

 Christiana Care Health System (Sidney Kimmel Medical College)
Christiana Hospital - Newark
 Middletown Emergency Department - Middletown
 Wilmington Hospital - Wilmington
 Nemours Children's Hospital, Delaware, Wilmington (Sidney Kimmel Medical College)

Florida

 Halifax Health, Daytona Beach
 Naples Community Hospital
 JFK Medical Center, Atlantis
 Bay Pines VA Hospital

Boynton Beach, Florida 

 Bethesda Health

Chattahoochee 
 Florida State Hospital, Florida State University College of Medicine

Fort Lauderdale

 Broward Health, Nova Southeastern University College of Osteopathic Medicine
 Broward Health Medical Center

Gainesville

 UF Health at the University of Florida
 J. Hillis Miller Health Science Center, University of Florida
UF Health Shands Hospital, University of Florida
University of Florida Cancer Hospital

Hollywood 
 Memorial Health Care System, Florida International University

Jacksonville 
UF Health Jacksonville, University of Florida
Mayo Clinic
Nemours Foundation
Wolfson Children's Hospital
VA Jacksonville Outpatient Clinic

Largo

 Largo Medical Center

Marianna

 Jackson Hospital, Florida State University College of Medicine

Miami 
 Baptist Hospital of Miami, Florida International University
 Jackson Memorial Hospital, Miller School of Medicine, University of Miami
 Mercy Hospital, Florida International University, Miami
 Miami Children’s Hospital, Florida International University, Miami
 University of Miami Hospital, University of Miami
Bascom Palmer Eye Institute, Miller School of Medicine
Aventura Hospital and Medical Center
Kendall Regional Medical Center
Nicklaus Children's Hospital

Miami Beach 
 Jackson North Hospital, Florida International University
 Mount Sinai Medical Center & Miami Heart Institute, Florida International University

Naples, Florida 

 NCH Healthcare System

Orlando, Florida 

Florida Hospital Medical Center
 Orlando Health
Orlando Regional Medical Center
Orlando Health UF Health Cancer Center
Arnold Palmer Hospital for Children
Nemours Children’s Hospital
Winnie Palmer Hospital for Women & Babies
Dr. P. Phillips Hospital
South Seminole Hospital

Port St. Lucie, Florida 

 St. Lucie Medical Center

Sarasota

 Sarasota Memorial Health Care System (Florida State University College of Medicine)

St. Petersburg

Bayfront Health St. Petersburg
Johns Hopkins All Children's Hospital

South Miami

 Larkin Community Hospital

Tallahassee

Tallahassee Memorial HealthCare (Florida A & M University, Florida State University)

Tampa

 Tampa General Hospital, University of South Florida Morsani College of Medicine
Florida Hospital, Tampa
James A. Haley VA Hospital, Tampa
Moffitt Cancer Center

Weston

 Cleveland Clinic

West Palm Beach

 St. Mary's Hospital
 Broward Health, Florida International University
 Cleveland Clinic Foundation Florida, Florida International University
West Palm Beach VA

Georgia 

 Dwight D. Eisenhower Army Medical Center
Northeast Georgia Medical Center, Gainesville
Emory University Orthopaedics and Spine Hospital, Tucker, Georgia
Gwinnett Medical Center, Lawrenceville & Duluth

Albany 
 Phoebe Putney Memorial Hospital

Athens

 Piedmont Athens Regional

Atlanta

Emory University Hospital
Grady Memorial Hospital, staffed by Emory & Morehouse Medical Schools
Emory University Hospital-Midtown
Atlanta Veterans Affairs Medical Center
Children's Healthcare of Atlanta
Atlanta Medical Center
Saint Joseph's Hospital (Atlanta)

Augusta 
Augusta University Medical Center
 University Hospital (Augusta, Georgia)

Brunswick 
 Southeast Georgia Health System

Columbus

 St. Francis Hospital (Columbus, Georgia)

Decatur

 Emory's Hope Clinic

Macon

 Medical Center of Central Georgia

Savannah 
 Memorial Health University Medical Center
St. Joseph's/Candler Health System

Hawaii

 The Queen's Medical Center, Honolulu
Tripler Army Medical Center
Kapiolani Medical Center for Women and Children
Straub Medical Center
Pali Momi Medical Center
Kuakini Medical Center
Wahiawa General Hospital
Kaiser Foundation Hospital
VA Pacific Islands Health Care System
Shriners Hospitals for Children

Idaho
 Boise VA Medical Center
Eastern Idaho Regional Medical Center, Idaho Falls, Idaho
Kootenai Health, Coeur d'Alene, Idaho

Illinois

Edward Hines Jr. Veterans Administration Hospital, Hines (Loyola University Medical School)
Advocate Christ Medical Center, Oak Lawn, Illinois
 Carle Foundation Hospital, Urbana, Illinois
Pana Community Hospital, Pana

Aurora

 Rush–Copley Medical Center

Carlinville

 Carlinville Area Hospital, Carlinville, Illinois

Chicago

 Advocate Illinois Masonic Medical Center(University of Illinois)
Advocate Lutheran General Hospital - Midwestern University, Rosalind Franklin University, University of Illinois
 Jesse Brown VA Medical Center
 John H. Stroger, Jr. Hospital of Cook County
 Anne & Robert H. Lurie Children's Hospital of Chicago - Northwestern University
Mercy Hospital and Medical Center(University of Illinois)
Mount Sinai Medical Center (Rosalind Franklin University of Medicine and Science and University of Chicago)
 Northwestern Memorial Hospital
 Norwegian American Hospital
 Rehabilitation Institute of Chicago
 Rush University Medical Center
 University of Chicago Medical Center
University of Illinois Hospital & Health Sciences System
Presence Resurrection Medical Center
Presence Saint Joseph Hospital(University of Illinois)
Presence Saints Mary and Elizabeth Medical Center
Provident Hospital (Chicago)
Riverside Medical Center
Schwab Rehabilitation Hospital
Sinai Children's Hospital
Swedish Covenant Hospital
The University of Illinois Eye and Ear Infirmary

Decatur

 St. Mary's Hospital
Decatur Memorial Hospital

Evanston

 NorthShore University HealthSystem
Presence Saint Francis Hospital(University of Illinois)

Harvey

 Ingalls Memorial Hospital

Lake Forest

 Northwestern Lake Forest Hospital

Maywood

 Loyola University Medical Center
 Edward Hines, Jr. VA Hospital

North Chicago 

 Captain James A. Lovell Federal Health Care Center (Rosalind Franklin University of Medicine and Science)

Peoria

 OSF Saint Francis Medical Center
 The Children's Hospital of Illinois (CHOI) and St. Jude Midwest Affiliate at OSF Saint Francis

Rockford 
 Swedish American Hospital
OSF Saint Anthony Medical Center

Springfield 
 Memorial Medical Center
 St. John's Hospital
St. John Children's Hospital
 Erie Family Health Center
 Advocate BroMenn Medical Center

Wheaton

 Marianjoy Rehabilitation Hospital and Clinics (Feinberg School of Medicine)

Winfield, Illinois

 Central DuPage Hospital

Indiana

Avon

 Indiana University Health West Hospital

Bedford

 Indiana University Health Bedford Hospital

Bloomington

 Indiana University Health Bloomington Hospital

Carmel

 Indiana University Health North Hospital
 Riley Hospital for Children at Indiana University Health North Hospital

Fishers

 Indiana University Health Saxony Hospital

Frankfort

 Indiana University Health Frankfort Hospital

Gary

 MacNeal Hospital
 Methodist Hospital

Hartford City

 Indiana University Health Blackford Hospital

Indianapolis

Indiana University Health Methodist Hospital
Indiana University Health University Hospital
IU Health North Medical Center
Riley Hospital for Children at Indiana University Health
Larue D. Carter Memorial Hospital
Richard L. Roudebush VA Medical Center
Sidney & Lois Eskenazi Hospital

Knox

 Starke Hospital

Lafayette

 Indiana University Health Arnett Hospital
 Indiana University Health Arnett Hospital Hospice

La Porte

 La Porte Hospital

Monticello

 Indiana University Health White Memorial Hospital

Muncie 
Ball Memorial Hospital

Paoli 

 Indiana University Health Paoli Hospital

Portland 

 Indiana University Health Jay Hospital

Terre Haute 

 Union Hospital (Indiana)

Tipton 

 Indiana University Health Tipton Hospital

Iowa

Cedar Rapids

 St. Luke's Hospital (Cedar Rapids, Iowa)

Decorah

 Winneshiek Medical Center

Des Moines

 Mercy Medical Center - Des Moines
Iowa Methodist medical Center

Iowa City

University of Iowa Hospitals and Clinics
University of Iowa Children's Hospital - Iowa City, Iowa

Sioux City 

 St. Luke's Regional Medical Center (Sioux City, Iowa)

Kansas 
 Ascension Via Christi Health
Menorah Medical Center, Overland Park, Kansas

Kansas City 
 University of Kansas Hospital
 University of Kansas Medical Center

Salina 
 Salina Regional Health Center

Topeka 
 University of Kansas Health System St. Francis Campus

Wichita 
 Wesley Medical Center
Wichita VA Medical Center

Kentucky 

 Our Lady of Bellefonte Hospital
 Pikeville Medical Center

Lexington 
 Albert B. Chandler Hospital, University of Kentucky
 Eastern State Hospital, University of Kentucky
 Good Samaritan Hospital, University of Kentucky
 Kentucky Children's Hospital, University of Kentucky
Lexington VA Medical Center
Saint Joseph Hospital (Lexington, Kentucky)
University of Kentucky Children's Hospital

Louisville 
 James Graham Brown Cancer Center
 Jewish Hospital & St. Mary's Healthcare
 Kosair Children's Hospital
 University of Louisville Hospital
 VA Medical Center
 Norton Healthcare

Louisiana

Baton Rouge 
 Our Lady of the Lake Regional Medical Center (Our Lady of the Lake College, Louisiana State University, Tulane University and Southern University)
Baton Rouge General Medical Center – Mid-City Campus
Baton Rouge General Medical Center – Bluebonnet Campus

Houma

 Leonard J Chabert Medical Center (LSU)

Lafayette

 University Hospitals and Clinics (LSU)
 Lafayette General Medical Center

Metairie

 East Jefferson General Hospital

New Orleans

 Ochsner Medical Center
 Tulane Medical Center
 Tulane University Hospital and Clinic
 Tulane–Lakeside Hospital
 Tulane Hospital for Children
 Tulane Cancer Center
 Tulane Abdominal Transplant 
 Tulane-Lakeside Women's Center
 Tulane Multispecialty Center Metairie
 Tulane Multispecialty Center uptown
 Tulane Multispecialty Center Downtown
 Tulane Institute for Sports Medicine
 University Medical Center (Louisiana State University School of Medicine, Tulane University School of Medicine)
 Charity Hospital 
 University Hospital

Shreveport 
University Health Sciences Center Shreveport

Maine 

 Central Maine Medical Center, Lewiston
 Eastern Maine Medical Center, Bangor
Maine Medical Center, Portland, Maine
 Barbara Bush Children's Hospital

Maryland

Annapolis, Maryland 

 Anne Arundel Medical Center

Baltimore

 Johns Hopkins Hospital, Baltimore
 Johns Hopkins Children's Center, Baltimore
 Johns Hopkins Bayview Medical Center, Baltimore
 University of Maryland Medical Center, Baltimore
R Adams Cowley Shock Trauma Center
University of Maryland Medical Center Midtown Campus
University of Maryland Rehabilitation & Orthopaedic Institute
Mt. Washington Pediatric Hospital
St. Agnes Hospital (Baltimore)
MedStar Harbor Hospital
MedStar Union Memorial Hospital
Kennedy Krieger Institute
MedStar Good Samaritan Hospital
Sinai Hospital

Bethesda

 Suburban Hospital, Bethesda
 Walter Reed National Military Medical Center, Bethesda
National Institutes of Health
National Institutes of Health Clinical Center

Columbia

 Howard County General Hospital, Columbia

Glen Burnie 

 University of Maryland Baltimore Washington Medical Center

Laurel, Maryland 

 University of Maryland Laurel Regional Hospital

La Plata 

 University of Maryland Charles Regional Medical Center

Salisbury 

 Peninsula Regional Medical Center

Towson, Maryland 

 University of Maryland St. Joseph Medical Center
 Greater Baltimore Medical Center

Massachusetts 

 Edith Nourse Rogers Memorial Veterans Hospital, Bedford
 McLean Hospital, Belmont
 Beverly Hospital, Beverly
 Cambridge Health Alliance
 Franciscan Children’s Hospital & Rehab. Center, Brighton
 Brockton Hospital, Brockton
 Bournewood Hospital, Brookline
 Human Resource Institute, Brookline
 Lahey Hospital and Medical Center, Burlington
Clinton Hospital, Clinton
Carney Hospital, Dorchester
CHA Everett Hospital
 Health Alliance Hospital, Fitchburg
MetroWest Medical Center, Framingham & Natick, Massachusetts
 Harvard Pilgrim Health Care
Lawrence General Hospital
 Health Alliance Hospital, Leominster
 Bay Ridge Hospital, Lynn 
Marlborough Hospital, Marlborough
Milford Regional Medical Center
Newton-Wellesley Hospital
VA Central Western Massachusetts Healthcare System, Northampton (University of Massachusetts Medical School)
Northampton VA Medical Center
 Norwood Hospital, Norwood
 Wing Memorial Hospital, Palmer
Berkshire Medical Center, Pittsfield, Massachusetts
 Quincy Medical Center, Quincy
 Hebrew Senior Life, Roslindale
 North Shore Children’s Hospital, Salem
 Spaulding Rehabilitation Hospital, Sandwich
 Harrington Memorial Hospital Southbridge
 Baystate Medical Center, Springfield
Morton Hospital and Medical Center, Taunton, Massachusetts
 Westwood Lodge Hospital, Westwood
 UMass Memorial Medical Center, Worcester

Boston 
 Beth Israel Deaconess Medical Center, Boston
 Boston Children's Hospital, Boston
 Boston Medical Center, Boston
 VA Boston Healthcare System (Harvard Medical School, Boston University School of Medicine)
 Brigham and Women's Hospital, Boston
 Brigham and Women's Faulkner Hospital, Boston
 Carney Hospital, Boston
 Dana–Farber Cancer Institute, Boston
 Floating Hospital for Children
 Joslin Diabetes Center, Boston
 Massachusetts Eye and Ear Infirmary, Boston
 Massachusetts General Hospital, Boston
 Massachusetts Mental Health Center, Boston
 New England Baptist Hospital, Boston
 St. Elizabeth's Medical Center (Boston)
 Schepens Eye Research Institute, Boston
 Tufts Medical Center, Boston

Cambridge 
 Cambridge Hospital, Cambridge 
 Mount Auburn Hospital, Cambridge

Michigan 

 Butterworth Hospital, Grand Rapids (Spectrum Health)
 Detroit Medical Center, Detroit
 Children's Hospital of Michigan
 Detroit Receiving Hospital
 Harper University Hospital
 Heart Hospital and Harper Specialty Center 
 Huron Valley-Sinai Hospital 
 Hutzel Women's Hospital 
 DMC Surgery Hospital 
 Rehabilitation Institute of Michigan
 Sinai-Grace Hospital
 Henry Ford Hospital
Bronson Methodist Hospital, Kalamazoo, Michigan (Michigan State University, Western Michigan University)
St. Mary's of Michigan Medical Center, Saginaw (Michigan State University College of Human Medicine; Central Michigan University)
 Sparrow Hospital, Michigan State University, Lansing
MidMichigan Medical Center-Midland (Michigan State University College of Human Medicine, Central Michigan University; family medicine residency program is affiliated with Michigan State University)
Marquette General Hospital (Michigan State University College of Human Medicine) 
 University of Michigan Health System, Ann Arbor 
C.S. Mott Children's Hospital
  University Hospital
 Von Voigtlander Women's Hospital
 William Beaumont Hospital, Grosse Pointe
 William Beaumont Hospital, Royal Oak
 William Beaumont Hospital, Troy
Genesys Regional Medical Center, Grand Blanc, Michigan
St. John Hospital and Medical Center, Detroit
Oakwood South Shore Hospital, Trenton, Michigan
Metropolitan Hospital, Grand Rapids
Henry Ford Wyandotte Hospital, Wyandotte, Michigan
POH - Regional Medical Center, Pontiac, Michigan
Garden City Hospital, Garden City
McLaren Macomb Medical Center, Mount Clemens, Michigan
St. John Oakland Hospital, Madison Heights, Michigan
Botsford General Hospital, Farmington Hills, Michigan
Henry Ford Macomb Hospital, Clinton Township, Macomb County, Michigan
Lakeland Health, St. Joseph, Michigan
Covenant HealthCare, Saginaw, Michigan
St. Mary's of Michigan, Saginaw, Michigan (Michigan State University College of Human and Central Michigan University) 
Providence Park Hospital/MSUCHM, Southfield
Ascension Macomb-Oakland Hospital, Warren, Michigan
Munson Medical Center, Traverse City, Michigan (Michigan State University College of Human Medicine, Michigan State University College of Osteopathic Medicine)
MSUCOM 
Mercy Health - Hackley Campus, Muskegon, Michigan
ProMedica Monroe Regional Hospital, Monroe
St. Mary Mercy, Livonia

Minnesota 

 University of Minnesota Medical Center, Minneapolis
University of Minnesota Medical Center, East Bank
University of Minnesota Masonic Children's Hospital
 Hennepin County Medical Center (HCMC), Minneapolis
 Minneapolis Veteran's Administration Hospital, Minneapolis
 Mayo Medical School, Rochester
Mayo Clinic Health System - Albert Lea
Mayo Clinic Health System - Austin
Mayo Clinic Health System - Cannon Falls
Mayo Clinic Health System - Fairmont
Fairview University Medical Center - Mesabi, Hibbing
Mayo Clinic Health System - Lake City
Mayo Clinic Health System - Mankato
Mayo Clinic Health System - Owatonna
Mayo Clinic Health System - Springfield
St. Cloud Hospital
Mayo Clinic Health System - St. James
Regions Hospital, Saint Paul
St. Joseph's Hospital (St. Paul, Minnesota), HelthEast - University of Minnesota _ University of Minnesota's Family Practice Resident Program
Children's St. Paul Pediatric Hospital, St. Paul
St. John's Hospital, HealthEast (St.Paul) - University of Minnesota's Family Practice Resident Program
United Hospital (United Family Medicine Residency Program)
Mayo Clinic Health System - Waseca
Cuyuna Regional Medical Center, Crosby
Abbott Northwestern Hospital, Minneapolis
Fairview Southdale Hospital, Edina, Minnesota

Mississippi 

 University of Mississippi Medical Center, Jackson
University Hospital and Clinics - Holmes County, Lexington

Missouri 

 University Health Truman Medical Center, Kansas City
 University Health Lakewood Medical Center, Kansas City
 Children's Mercy Hospital, Kansas City
 Western Missouri Mental Health Center, Kansas City
 Saint Luke's Hospital, Kansas City
 Saint Luke's Northland, Kansas City
 Baptist-Lutheran Medical Center, Kansas City
 Barnes-Jewish Hospital, St. Louis
 Cardinal Glennon Children's Hospital, St. Louis
 Rehabilitation Institute of St. Louis
 St. Louis Children's Hospital, St. Louis
 Saint Louis University Hospital, St. Louis
Harry S. Truman Memorial Veterans' Hospital, Columbia
University of Missouri Health Care, Columbia
Columbia Regional Hospital
University of Missouri Children's Hospital
University of Missouri Hospital
University of Missouri Women's and Children's Hospital
Ellis Fischel Cancer Center
 Washington University Medical Center, St. Louis
 Barnes-Jewish St. Peters Hospital, St. Peters
Barnes-Jewish West County Hospital
Boone Hospital Center, Columbia
Freeman Health System, Joplin
Research Medical Center, Kansas City

Montana
Billings Clinic, Billings
Benefis Health System, Great Falls

Nebraska 

 Creighton University Medical Center, Omaha
Nebraska Medical Center, Omaha

Nevada 

 Valley Hospital Medical Center, Las Vegas
 Saint Mary's Regional Medical Center, Reno (University of Nevada, Reno School of Medicine)
 Boulder City Hospital, Boulder City (UNLV School of Medicine)
 Renown Regional Medical Center, Reno (University of Nevada, Reno School of Medicine)
Sunrise Hospital & Medical Center, Winchester, Nevada
University Medical Center of Southern Nevada, Las Vegas
Northern Nevada Medical Center, Sparks
VA Southern Nevada Healthcare System, North Las Vegas

New Hampshire 

 Dartmouth-Hitchcock Medical Center, Lebanon
Norris Cotton Cancer Center
Cheshire Medical Center
Southern New Hampshire Health System, Nashua
Concord Hospital (New Hampshire), Concord
Manchester VA Medical Center (Dartmouth Medical College)
Portsmouth Regional Hospital, Portsmouth

New Jersey 

 Hoboken University Medical Center, Hoboken
 CentraState Medical Center, Freehold Twp
 Cooper University Hospital, Camden
 Hackensack University Medical Center, Hackensack
Morristown Medical Center, Morristown, New Jersey
 Jersey Shore University Medical Center, Neptune
 Kennedy University Hospitals, (Cherry Hill, Stratford, Washington Twp.)
 Robert Wood Johnson University Hospital, New Brunswick
 Saint Peter's University Hospital, New Brunswick
 The University Hospital, Newark
 Newark Beth Israel Medical Center, Newark, New Jersey
 Trinitas Regional Medical Center, Elizabeth, New Jersey
 University Medical Center at Princeton, Princeton
Our Lady of Lourdes Medical Center, Camden
Jersey City Medical Center, Jersey City, New Jersey
Palisades Medical Center, North Bergen, New Jersey
St. Barnabas Medical Center, Livingston, New Jersey

New Mexico 

 University of New Mexico Hospital, Albuquerque
UNM Carrie Tingley Hospital
UNM Children's Hospital
UNM Children's Psychiatric Center
UNM Hospital
UNM Psychiatric Center
UNM Cancer Center, Las Cruces, New Mexico
 University of New Mexico Hospital- Sandoval County, Rio Rancho
Memorial Medical Center, Las Cruces, New Mexico
Taos Orthopaedic Institute and Research Foundation, Taos, New Mexico
Mountain View Regional Medical Center, Las Cruces, New Mexico

New York 

 Albany Medical Center Hospital, Albany
 Mary Imogene Bassett Hospital (Basset Medical Center), Cooperstown
Glen Cove Hospital, Glen Cove, New York
 Long Island Jewish Medical Center (Glen Oaks, Queens; Lake Success, New York; Forest Hills, Queens)
Nassau University Medical Center, Nassau County (Stony Brook University)
 NY-Presbyterian/Westchester Division, White Plains
 North Shore University Hospital, Manhasset (Hofstra Northwell School of Medicine, New York University School of Medicine, Albert Einstein College of Medicine)
 Plainview Hospital, Plainview (New York College of Osteopathic Medicine)
 Stony Brook University Medical Center, at Stony Brook University
 University of Rochester Medical Center, Rochester
 Upstate University Hospital, Syracuse
 Westchester Medical Center University Hospital, at Valhalla, New York
St. Joseph's Medical Center (Yonkers, New York)
 Winthrop-University Hospital, Mineola, New York
 Burke Rehabilitation Hospital, White Plains, New York
Syosset Hospital, Syosset, New York
North Shore University Hospital - Southside Hospital, Bay Shore, New York
Lawrence Hospital, Bronxville, New York
Long Beach Medical Center
Arnot Ogden Medical Center, Elmira, New York
Orange Regional Medical Center, Middletown, New York
Northport VA Medical Center, Northport, New York (Stony Brook University)
Good Samaritan Hospital Medical Center (West Islip, New York)
VA Western New York Healthcare System, Buffalo and Batavia (SUNY at Buffalo)
Franklin Hospital, Valley Stream, New York

Buffalo, New York 

 Buffalo General Hospital 
 Erie County Medical Center, Buffalo
 Millard Fillmore Hospital, Buffalo
 Roswell Park Comprehensive Cancer Center, Buffalo 
 John R. Oishei Children's Hospital

New York City

Manhattan 

Bellevue Hospital Center, Manhattan
Gouverneur Health, New York City
Harlem Hospital Center, Harlem, Manhattan
Lenox Hill Hospital, Manhattan (Hofstra Northwell School of Medicine, New York University School of Medicine, New York Medical College, State University of New York Downstate Medical Center College of Medicine)
Lower Manhattan Hospital, Manhattan (is part of the NewYork-Presbyterian Healthcare System)
Manhattan Eye, Ear and Throat Hospital
Metropolitan Hospital Center
Mount Sinai Health System
Mount Sinai Beth Israel, Manhattan
Mount Sinai Hospital, Manhattan
 Mount Sinai Queens
 Mount Sinai Brooklyn
New York Eye and Ear Infirmary of Mount Sinai
Mount Sinai Morningside
Mount Sinai West 
 New York Hospital Queens
NYU Langone Medical Center, Manhattan
New York-Presbyterian Hospital, Manhattan
NewYork–Presbyterian/Queens
North General Hospital
Saint Vincent's Catholic Medical Center, Manhattan
New York University Medical Center, New York City
Hospital for Special Surgery (Weill Cornell Graduate School of Medical Sciences)

The Bronx 
 Bronx-Lebanon Hospital Center, The Bronx
 James J. Peters VA Medical Center, The Bronx
 Lincoln Hospital, The Bronx
 Montefiore Medical Center, The Bronx
 St Barnabas Hospital, The Bronx

Brooklyn 

 Brooklyn Hospital Center, Brooklyn
 Coney Island Hospital, Brooklyn
 Long Island College Hospital, Brooklyn
 Maimonides Medical Center, Brooklyn
 New York Methodist Hospital, Brooklyn
 State University of New York Downstate Medical Center, Brooklyn
Brookdale University Hospital and Medical Center
Kings County Hospital Center

Queens

 Queens General Center Hospital
 Zucker Hillside Hospital
Cohen Children's Medical Center

Staten Island 

 Staten Island University Hospital, Staten Island (State University of New York Downstate Medical Center College of Medicine, Touro College of Osteopathic Medicine)

North Carolina 

Carolinas Medical Center, Charlotte
Levine Children's Hospital, Charlotte
 Duke University Health System
 Duke Cancer Institute
 Duke Children's Hospital and Health Center, Durham
 Duke Raleigh Hospital, Raleigh, North Carolina
 Duke Regional Hospital, Durham
 Duke University Medical Center, Durham
 Cherry Hospital, Goldsboro, North Carolina (Brody School of Medicine at East Carolina University and Campbell University)
 Vidant Health (formerly University Health Systems of Eastern Carolina), Greenville
 Vidant Beaufort Hospital, Washington
 Bertie Memorial Hospital, Windsor
 Chowan Hospital, Edenton
 Vidant Medical Center, Greenville
 Duplin General Hospital, Kenansville
 Heritage Hospital, Tarboro
 The Outer Banks Hospital, Nags Head
 Roanoke-Chowan Hospital, Ahoskie
 UNC Hospitals, Chapel Hill (University of North Carolina at Chapel Hill, University of North Carolina School of Medicine)
 UNC Medical Center
 Rex Healthcare, Raleigh, North Carolina
 Chatham Hospital
 High Point Regional Health
 Caldwell Memorial Hospital, Lenoir, North Carolina
 Johnston Health
 Pardee Hospital
 Nash Health Care
 Wayne Memorial Hospital 
 UNC Lenoir Health Care
 UNC Faculty Physicians
 UNC Physicians Network
 NC Memorial Hospital
 NC Children's Hospital
 NC Women's Hospital
 NC Cancer Hospital (clinical home of the UNC Lineberger Comprehensive Cancer Center)
 NC Neurosciences Hospital
 Brenner Children's Hospital, Winston-Salem, North Carolina
 Wake Forest Baptist Medical Center, Winston-Salem
 WakeMed Cary Hospital
 WakeMed Raleigh Campus
 Wilson Medical Center (North Carolina), Wilson, North Carolina (Duke University)
 Moses H. Cone Memorial Hospital, Greensboro
Cape Fear Valley Medical Center, Fayetteville, North Carolina
Southeastern Health/CUSOM, Lumberton, North Carolina
New Hanover Regional Medical Center, Wilmington

Ohio 

Cleveland Clinic Akron General, Akron
Akron Children's Hospital
Summa Health, Akron
Summa Akron City Hospital
St. Thomas Campus
Ashtabula County Medical Center, Ashtabula, Ohio
Ohio Health - O'Bleness Hospital, Athens
University Hospitals Ahuja Medical Center, Beachwood, Ohio
University Hospitals Bedford Medical Center 
St Elizabeth Boardman Hospital, Boardman
CORE / Adena Health System, Chillicothe
Mercy Health - The Jewish Hospital, Cincinnati
TriHealth - Good Samaritan Hospital, Cincinnati
Cincinnati Children's Hospital Medical Center
Shriners Hospitals for Children, Cincinnati
The Christ Hospital, Cincinnati
 University of Cincinnati Medical Center, University of Cincinnati, Cincinnati
 MetroHealth Medical Center, Case Western Reserve University, Cleveland
 University Hospitals Cleveland Medical Center, Case Western Reserve University, Cleveland
 Rainbow Babies & Children's Hospital, Case Western Reserve University, Cleveland
Cleveland Clinic, Cleveland Clinic Lerner College of Medicine at Case Western Reserve University, Cleveland
Fairview Hospital
Lutheran Hospital
South Pointe Hospital - Cleveland Clinic Health System, Cleveland
The Ohio State University Medical Center, Ohio State University, Columbus
Louis Stokes Cleveland VA Medical Center
Ohio Health - Grant Medical Center, Columbus
Ohio Health - Doctors Hospital, Columbus
Ohio Health - Riverside Methodist Hospital, Columbus, Ohio
Mount Carmel East, Columbus
Mount Carmel West, Columbus
Dayton Children's Hospital (Boonshoft School of Medicine)
Dayton VA Medical Center (Boonshoft School of Medicine)
Good Samaritan Hospital (Dayton) (Boonshoft School of Medicine)
Grandview Medical Center, Dayton
Miami Valley Hospital, Dayton
OhioHealth Dublin Methodist Hospital, Dublin, Ohio (only Family Medicine Residency)
 Kettering Medical Center, Kettering
Memorial Health System, Marietta
Hillcrest Hospital, Mayfield Heights, Ohio
Bethesda North Hospital, Montgomery
OUCOM / Southern Ohio Medical Center; Portsmouth
University Hospitals Portage Medical Center, Ravenna, Ohio
University Hospitals Richmond Medical Center, Richmond Heights
University of Toledo Medical Center, University of Toledo, Toledo
Mercy Health - St. Vincent Medical Center, Toledo
University Hospitals St. John Medical Center, Westlake (University Hospitals of Cleveland)
Mercy Health - St. Elizabeth Boardman Hospital, Youngstown, Ohio
Mercy Health - St. Joseph Warren Hospital, Youngstown, Ohio
Steward Health - Northside Regional Medical Center, Youngstown, Ohio

Oklahoma 

 Oklahoma State University Medical Center, Tulsa
OU Medicine
OU Medical Center
OU Medical Center Edmond
The Children's Hospital 
OU Physicians
OU Children's Physicians
Stephenson Cancer Center
AllianceHealth Durant, Durant
Comanche County Memorial Hospital, Lawton, Oklahoma
Norman Regional Health System, Norman, Oklahoma
OSUCOM Southwest Medical Center, Oklahoma City

Oregon 

Oregon Health & Science University Hospital, Portland
Doernbecher Children's Hospital, Portland
Shriners Hospital for Children (Portland)
Veterans Affairs Medical Center (Oregon), Portland
Legacy Good Samaritan Medical Center, Portland
Tuality Community Hospital, Hillsboro
Salem Hospital (Oregon)
Good Samaritan Regional Medical Center, Corvallis
Sky Lakes Medical Center, Klamath Falls
Legacy Emanuel Medical Center
Legacy Good Samaritan Medical Center

Pennsylvania 

 Einstein Health Network
 Einstein Medical Center Philadelphia
 Einstein Medical Center Elkins Park
 Einstein Medical Center Montgomery
Jefferson Health :
Thomas Jefferson University Hospital, Philadelphia
Jefferson Hospital for Neuroscience
Lehigh Valley Health Network, Allentown
Lehigh Valley Hospital-17th Street, Allentown
Lehigh Valley Hospital–Cedar Crest, Salisbury Township
Jefferson Methodist Hospital
Jefferson Abington Hospital, Abington
Jefferson Health Northeast (Philadelphia College of Osteopathic Medicine)
Mercy Catholic Medical Center (MCMC)
Mercy Fitzgerald Hospital, Darby, Pennsylvania
Mercy Philadelphia Hospital
Nazareth Hospital, Philadelphia
Bryn Mawr Hospital
Geisinger Medical Center, Danville
Millcreek Community Hospital LECOM Health, Erie
St. Vincent Health Center, Erie
Penn State Milton S. Hershey Medical Center, Hershey
Conemaugh Memorial Medical Center, Johnstown
Fox Chase Cancer Center, Philadelphia
Friends Hospital, Philadelphia
Hahnemann University Hospital, Philadelphia
Magee Rehabilitation Hospital
St. Christopher's Hospital for Children, Philadelphia
Temple University Hospital, Philadelphia
University of Pennsylvania Health System, Philadelphia
Lancaster General Hospital, Lancaster
Penn Presbyterian Medical Center
Pennsylvania Hospital
University of Pittsburgh Medical Center, Pittsburgh
UPMC Hamot, Erie
UPMC Presbyterian
UPMC Magee-Womens
UPMC Children's Hospital of Pittsburgh
UPMC Mercy
West Penn Allegheny Health System, Pittsburgh
Crozer-Chester Medical Center, Upland
St. Christopher's Hospital for Children
 Mercy Hospital, Scranton
Reading Hospital and Medical Center, Reading
 St. Luke's University Hospital, Bethlehem
Wilkes-Barre General Hospital, Wilkes-Barre
Williamsport Regional Medical Center, Williamsport
Coatesville VA Medical Center, Coatesville
Crozer-Chester Medical Center, Chester
Eagleville Hospital, Eagleville
Easton Hospital, Easton
Holy Redeemer Hospital, Meadowbrook
Mercy Hospital of Philadelphia, Philadelphia
Pinnacle Hospital, Harrisburg
Reading Hospital, Reading
St. Christopher's Hospital for Children, Philadelphia
Allegheny General Hospital, Pittsburgh
WellSpan York Hospital, York
Memorial Hospital, York

Guthrie Robert Packer Hospital, Sayre, Pennsylvania
Lankenau Medical Center, Wynnewood, Pennsylvania

Rhode Island 

 Rhode Island Hospital, Warren Alpert Medical School of Brown University
Hasbro Children's Hospital
 Roger Williams Medical Center, Providence
Bradley Hospital, East Providence
Butler Hospital, Providence
Kent Hospital, Warwick
Memorial Hospital of Rhode Island, Pawtucket
Miriam Hospital, Providence
Westerly Hospital (Yale-New Haven Health System)
Women & Infants Hospital of Rhode Island, Providence

South Carolina 

 Greenville Memorial Hospital, Greenville
 Greenville Hospital System University Medical Center
 MUSC Health University Medical Center, Charleston
 Palmetto Health Richland, Columbia
 Palmetto Health Baptist Columbia
 Palmetto Health Children's Hospital
 Palmetto Health South Carolina Cancer Center
 William Jennings Bryan Dorn VA Medical Center
Lexington Medical Center, Lexington
Spartanburg Regional Healthcare System
Grand Strand Medical Center, Myrtle Beach, South Carolina
McLeod Regional Medical Center, Florence

South Dakota

 Sanford USD Medical Center, Sioux Falls
 Sanford Vermillion Medical Center, Vermillion
 Avera Sacred Heart Hospital, Yankton
Rapid City Regional Hospital, Rapid City, South Dakota

Tennessee

Chattanooga

 Erlanger Health System (University of Tennessee College of Medicine)

Johnson City

 Johnson City Medical Center

Knoxville

University of Tennessee Medical Center
East Tennessee Children's Hospital

Memphis 
 Hamilton Eye Institute
 Le Bonheur Children's Medical Center
 St. Jude Children's Research Hospital
 Methodist University Hospital
 Regional One Health

Nashville 
 Vanderbilt University Medical Center
Monroe Carell Jr. Children's Hospital at Vanderbilt
Vanderbilt-Ingram Cancer Center
The Vanderbilt Clinic also known as TVC
Vanderbilt Diabetes Center
Vanderbilt Orthopaedics Institute
Vanderbilt Page Campbell Heart Institute
Vanderbilt Rehabilitation Hospital
Vanderbilt Sports Medicine Center
Vanderbilt Stallworth Rehabilitation Hospital
Vanderbilt Transplant Center
Vanderbilt University Bill Wilkerson Center
Saint Thomas Health (University of Tennessee Health Science Center)

Texas 

 UT Health East Texas-Athens
 UT Health East Texas Carthage
 UT Health East Texas-Jacksonville
 UT Health East Texas - Pittsburg
 UT Health East Texas - Tyler
 UT Health East Texas - North Campus Tyler
Carl R. Darnall Army Medical Center, Fort Hood
John Peter Smith Hospital, Fort Worth, Texas
CHRISTUS Spohn Hospital Corpus Christi - Shoreline, Corpus Christi, Texas

Austin

 Dell Seton Medical Center at The University of Texas

Dallas 

University of Texas Southwestern - University Hospitals, Dallas
Children's Medical Center - University of Texas Southwestern Medical School, Dallas
Parkland Memorial Hospital, Dallas
Presbyterian Hospital of Dallas
Methodist Health System
Methodist Dallas Medical Center

Denton

 UBH Denton

El Paso

University Medical Center of El Paso
William Beaumont Army Medical Center, El Paso, Texas

Galveston 

 University of Texas Medical Branch (UTMB) at Galveston University Hospital, Galveston
UTMB Children's Hospital
Shriners Hospital for Children (Galveston)
 Rebecca Sealy Hospital, Galveston (University of Texas Medical Branch)
John Sealy Hospital, Galveston (University of Texas Medical Branch)

Houston 

University of Texas MD Anderson Cancer Center - Houston, Texas
University of Texas Health Science Center at Houston
Texas Medical Center - Baylor College of Medicine, McGovern Medical School, Houston, Texas
Memorial Hermann–Texas Medical Center
TIRR Memorial Hermann
Michael E. DeBakey Veterans Affairs Medical Center in Houston
Texas Children's Hospital - Baylor College of Medicine, Houston, Texas
Baylor St. Luke's Medical Center - Baylor College of Medicine, Houston, Texas
Michael E. DeBakey Veterans Affairs Medical Center in Houston - Baylor College of Medicine, Houston, Texas
Memorial Hermann Healthcare System - Baylor College of Medicine, Houston, Texas
The Menninger Clinic - Baylor College of Medicine, Houston, Texas
Woman's Hospital of Texas
CHI St. Luke's Health
Houston Methodist
Harris Health System
Ben Taub Hospital - Baylor College of Medicine, Houston, Texas
Lyndon Baines Johnson General Hospital
Quentin Mease Community Hospital

Lubbock 

 University Medical Center, Lubbock

Plano 

 Children's Medical Center at Legacy, Plano, Texas

San Antonio 

University Health System, San Antonio
University Hospital Robert B. Green Campus
 Children's Hospital of San Antonio - Baylor College of Medicine, San Antonio, Texas
Brooke Army Medical Center (University of Texas Health Science Center at San Antonio and USUHS)

Temple 

 Scott & White Medical Center

Utah 

 University of Utah Hospital, Salt Lake City
Huntsman Cancer Institute, Salt Lake City
Primary Children's Hospital
University Neuropsychiatric Institute
Intermountain Medical Center
McKay-Dee Hospital, Ogden, Utah
Utah Valley Hospital, Provo, Utah
Ogden Regional Medical Center

Vermont 

University of Vermont Medical Center, Burlington, Vermont
Veterans Affairs Medical Center, White River Junction
 Fletcher Allen Health Care, Burlington
Central Vermont Medical Center

Virginia

Abingdon

 Johnston Memorial Hospital

Charlottesville, Virginia

 University of Virginia Health System

Christiansburg, Virginia 

 Omnee Carilion New River Valley Medical Center

Falls Church 
 Inova Fairfax Hospital
Inova Neuroscience & Spine Institute

Front Royal

 Valley Health System

Hampton

 Veterans Affairs Medical Center - Eastern Virginia Medical School

Lynchburg

 Centra Health

Newport News

 Riverside Regional Medical Center

Norfolk

 Children's Hospital of The King's Daughters - Eastern Virginia Medical School
 Sentara Norfolk General Hospital - Eastern Virginia Medical School
 Sentara Heart Hospital - Eastern Virginia Medical School
 Bon Secours Depaul Hospital - Eastern Virginia Medical School

Norton

 Norton Community Hospital

Portsmouth

 Bon Secours Maryview Hospital - Eastern Virginia Medical School
Portsmouth Naval Hospital - Eastern Virginia Medical School

Richmond 
 Virginia Commonwealth University Medical Center
Chippenham & Johnston-Willis Hospitals

Roanoke, Virginia 
 Carilion Clinic - Virginia Tech Carilion School of Medicine

Salem 

 LewisGale Medical Center
Salem VA Medical Center (University of Virginia School of Medicine, Edward Via College of Osteopathic Medicine and Virginia Tech Carilion School of Medicine)

Virginia Beach 
 Sentara Leigh Hospital - Eastern Virginia Medical School
 Sentara Princess Anne Hospital - Eastern Virginia Medical School
 Sentara Virginia Beach General Hospital - Eastern Virginia Medical School

Williamsburg 
 Eastern State Mental Hospital - Eastern Virginia Medical School

Washington 

 University of Washington Medical Center, Seattle
 Harborview Medical Center, Seattle
 Seattle Children's Hospital
 Northwest Hospital & Medical Center, Seattle
Virginia Mason Hospital, Seattle
 Valley Medical Center, Renton
 Skagit Valley Hospital
Providence St. Peter Hospital, Olympia
Mary Bridge Children's Hospital, Tacoma
Madigan Army Medical Center, Tacoma
St. Joseph Medical Center (Tacoma, Washington)
Swedish Medical Center/First Hill, Seattle
VA Pudget Sound Health Care System
Valley Medical Center, Renton, Washington
Providence Sacred Heart Medical Center, Spokane, Washington
Kaiser Permanente Washington, Seattle
PeaceHealth Southwest Medical Center, Vancouver
Kadlec Regional Medical Center, Richland
Skagit Regional Health, Mt. Vernon
Trios Health, Kennewick
MultiCare Health System, Tacoma
Harrison Medical Center, Bremerton

West Virginia 
 West Virginia University Hospitals, Martinsburg
 West Virginia University Hospitals, Ranson
 West Virginia University Hospitals, Morgantown
J.W. Ruby Memorial, Morgantown
WVU Children's Hospital - Morgantown, West Virginia
 Charleston Area Medical Center, Charleston
 Veterans Affairs Medical Center, Huntington
 Cabell Huntington Hospital, Huntington
 St. Mary's Medical Center, Huntington (Marshall University Joan C. Edwards School of Medicine)
 Marshall University Rural Health Clinic, Chapmanville
Ohio Valley Medical Center, Wheeling (West Virginia School of Osteopathic Medicine)
United Hospital Center, Bridgeport

Wisconsin 

 Froedtert Hospital (Medical College of Wisconsin, Milwaukee)
Children's Hospital of Wisconsin (Medical College of Wisconsin, Milwaukee)
University of Wisconsin Hospital and Clinics 
Gundersen Lutheran Medical Center (University of Wisconsin School of Medicine and Public Health)
Meriter Hospital, Madison
St. Mary's Hospital Medical Center, Green Bay (Medical College of Wisconsin, Milwaukee)
Mayo Clinic Health System - Arcadia (Franciscan Healthcare)
Mayo Clinic Health System - Northland
Mayo Clinic Health System - Chippewa Valley
Mayo Clinic Health System - Eau Claire
Mayo Clinic Health System - La Crosse (Franciscan Healthcare)
Marshfield Clinic, Marshfield
Mayo Clinic Health System - Red Cedar
ThedaCare Regional Medical Center–Neenah
Mercy Health System, Janesville, Wisconsin
Aurora Health Care, Milwaukee

Vietnam

Hồ Chí Minh city (see Saigon) 
 115 people's hospital
 1st Children's hospital
 2nd Children's hospital
 Bình Dân hospital for surgeon
 Chợ Rẫy hospital
 Gia Định people's hospital
 Hospital of Bình Tân district
 Hospital of Thủ Đức district
 Hồ Chí Minh city hospital of Blood transfusion and Heamatology
 Hồ Chí Minh city hospital of Cancer
 Hồ Chí Minh city hospital of Dermatology and Venereal diseases
 Hồ Chí Minh city hospital of Ear - nose - throat
 Hồ Chí Minh city hospital of Odontostomatology
 Hồ Chí Minh city hospital of Ophthalmology
 Hồ Chí Minh city hospital of Trauma and Orthopedics
 Hồ Chí Minh city hospital of Tropical diseases
 Hùng Vương hospital of Obstetrics and Gynecology
 Nguyễn Trãi hospital
 Nguyễn Tri Phương hospital
 University medical center - Hồ Chí Minh city university of Medicines and Pharmacy
 Phạm Ngọc Thạch hospital of Tuberculogy and Lung Diseases
 Trưng Vương hospital
 Từ Dũ hospital of Obstetrics and Gynecology
 Institute of Traditional medicines

See also 
Medical school
Teaching hospital

References

List

University